

284001–284100 

|-bgcolor=#fefefe
| 284001 ||  || — || October 5, 2004 || Kitt Peak || Spacewatch || — || align=right data-sort-value="0.86" | 860 m || 
|-id=002 bgcolor=#fefefe
| 284002 ||  || — || October 7, 2004 || Socorro || LINEAR || — || align=right data-sort-value="0.94" | 940 m || 
|-id=003 bgcolor=#fefefe
| 284003 ||  || — || October 7, 2004 || Anderson Mesa || LONEOS || NYS || align=right data-sort-value="0.97" | 970 m || 
|-id=004 bgcolor=#fefefe
| 284004 ||  || — || October 7, 2004 || Anderson Mesa || LONEOS || — || align=right | 2.4 km || 
|-id=005 bgcolor=#fefefe
| 284005 ||  || — || October 7, 2004 || Socorro || LINEAR || NYS || align=right data-sort-value="0.72" | 720 m || 
|-id=006 bgcolor=#fefefe
| 284006 ||  || — || October 7, 2004 || Socorro || LINEAR || V || align=right | 1.1 km || 
|-id=007 bgcolor=#fefefe
| 284007 ||  || — || October 7, 2004 || Socorro || LINEAR || MAS || align=right data-sort-value="0.89" | 890 m || 
|-id=008 bgcolor=#fefefe
| 284008 ||  || — || October 6, 2004 || Kitt Peak || Spacewatch || MAS || align=right data-sort-value="0.83" | 830 m || 
|-id=009 bgcolor=#fefefe
| 284009 ||  || — || October 6, 2004 || Kitt Peak || Spacewatch || MAS || align=right data-sort-value="0.87" | 870 m || 
|-id=010 bgcolor=#d6d6d6
| 284010 ||  || — || October 7, 2004 || Kitt Peak || Spacewatch || SHU3:2 || align=right | 6.4 km || 
|-id=011 bgcolor=#fefefe
| 284011 ||  || — || October 7, 2004 || Kitt Peak || Spacewatch || MAS || align=right | 1.0 km || 
|-id=012 bgcolor=#fefefe
| 284012 ||  || — || October 9, 2004 || Kitt Peak || Spacewatch || NYS || align=right data-sort-value="0.79" | 790 m || 
|-id=013 bgcolor=#E9E9E9
| 284013 ||  || — || October 12, 2004 || Moletai || K. Černis, J. Zdanavičius || HOF || align=right | 2.9 km || 
|-id=014 bgcolor=#fefefe
| 284014 ||  || — || October 9, 2004 || Kitt Peak || Spacewatch || NYS || align=right data-sort-value="0.81" | 810 m || 
|-id=015 bgcolor=#fefefe
| 284015 ||  || — || October 9, 2004 || Kitt Peak || Spacewatch || — || align=right | 1.2 km || 
|-id=016 bgcolor=#fefefe
| 284016 ||  || — || October 10, 2004 || Kitt Peak || Spacewatch || — || align=right | 1.3 km || 
|-id=017 bgcolor=#fefefe
| 284017 ||  || — || October 12, 2004 || Kitt Peak || Spacewatch || MAS || align=right data-sort-value="0.93" | 930 m || 
|-id=018 bgcolor=#fefefe
| 284018 ||  || — || October 15, 2004 || Socorro || LINEAR || — || align=right | 1.3 km || 
|-id=019 bgcolor=#fefefe
| 284019 ||  || — || October 7, 2004 || Kitt Peak || Spacewatch || NYS || align=right data-sort-value="0.83" | 830 m || 
|-id=020 bgcolor=#fefefe
| 284020 ||  || — || October 18, 2004 || Socorro || LINEAR || — || align=right | 1.1 km || 
|-id=021 bgcolor=#fefefe
| 284021 ||  || — || November 3, 2004 || Anderson Mesa || LONEOS || H || align=right data-sort-value="0.73" | 730 m || 
|-id=022 bgcolor=#fefefe
| 284022 ||  || — || November 5, 2004 || Anderson Mesa || LONEOS || — || align=right | 1.3 km || 
|-id=023 bgcolor=#fefefe
| 284023 ||  || — || November 4, 2004 || Kitt Peak || Spacewatch || — || align=right | 1.1 km || 
|-id=024 bgcolor=#fefefe
| 284024 ||  || — || November 4, 2004 || Kitt Peak || Spacewatch || — || align=right data-sort-value="0.97" | 970 m || 
|-id=025 bgcolor=#fefefe
| 284025 ||  || — || November 7, 2004 || Socorro || LINEAR || NYS || align=right data-sort-value="0.79" | 790 m || 
|-id=026 bgcolor=#fefefe
| 284026 ||  || — || November 7, 2004 || Needville || Needville Obs. || — || align=right | 1.7 km || 
|-id=027 bgcolor=#fefefe
| 284027 ||  || — || November 3, 2004 || Kitt Peak || Spacewatch || MAS || align=right data-sort-value="0.98" | 980 m || 
|-id=028 bgcolor=#fefefe
| 284028 ||  || — || November 19, 2004 || Socorro || LINEAR || CIM || align=right | 2.6 km || 
|-id=029 bgcolor=#d6d6d6
| 284029 Esplugafrancoli ||  ||  || December 10, 2004 || Begues || J. Manteca || — || align=right | 3.9 km || 
|-id=030 bgcolor=#E9E9E9
| 284030 ||  || — || December 9, 2004 || Catalina || CSS || — || align=right | 4.0 km || 
|-id=031 bgcolor=#fefefe
| 284031 ||  || — || December 10, 2004 || Socorro || LINEAR || MAS || align=right data-sort-value="0.96" | 960 m || 
|-id=032 bgcolor=#E9E9E9
| 284032 ||  || — || December 11, 2004 || Socorro || LINEAR || — || align=right | 1.7 km || 
|-id=033 bgcolor=#E9E9E9
| 284033 ||  || — || December 9, 2004 || Catalina || CSS || HNS || align=right | 1.9 km || 
|-id=034 bgcolor=#E9E9E9
| 284034 ||  || — || December 15, 2004 || Socorro || LINEAR || — || align=right | 2.4 km || 
|-id=035 bgcolor=#fefefe
| 284035 ||  || — || December 3, 2004 || Anderson Mesa || LONEOS || LCI || align=right | 1.7 km || 
|-id=036 bgcolor=#fefefe
| 284036 ||  || — || December 18, 2004 || Mount Lemmon || Mount Lemmon Survey || — || align=right | 1.2 km || 
|-id=037 bgcolor=#E9E9E9
| 284037 ||  || — || December 18, 2004 || Mount Lemmon || Mount Lemmon Survey || — || align=right | 1.1 km || 
|-id=038 bgcolor=#E9E9E9
| 284038 ||  || — || December 18, 2004 || Socorro || LINEAR || JUN || align=right | 1.7 km || 
|-id=039 bgcolor=#E9E9E9
| 284039 ||  || — || December 20, 2004 || Mount Lemmon || Mount Lemmon Survey || HNS || align=right | 1.8 km || 
|-id=040 bgcolor=#E9E9E9
| 284040 ||  || — || January 7, 2005 || Catalina || CSS || — || align=right | 2.6 km || 
|-id=041 bgcolor=#E9E9E9
| 284041 ||  || — || January 8, 2005 || Campo Imperatore || CINEOS || — || align=right | 1.7 km || 
|-id=042 bgcolor=#E9E9E9
| 284042 ||  || — || January 13, 2005 || Socorro || LINEAR || MAR || align=right | 1.5 km || 
|-id=043 bgcolor=#E9E9E9
| 284043 ||  || — || January 11, 2005 || Socorro || LINEAR || — || align=right | 1.2 km || 
|-id=044 bgcolor=#C2FFFF
| 284044 ||  || — || January 13, 2005 || Kitt Peak || Spacewatch || L5 || align=right | 12 km || 
|-id=045 bgcolor=#E9E9E9
| 284045 ||  || — || January 13, 2005 || Kitt Peak || Spacewatch || — || align=right | 1.3 km || 
|-id=046 bgcolor=#C2FFFF
| 284046 ||  || — || January 15, 2005 || Kitt Peak || Spacewatch || L5 || align=right | 15 km || 
|-id=047 bgcolor=#C2FFFF
| 284047 ||  || — || January 15, 2005 || Kitt Peak || Spacewatch || L5 || align=right | 16 km || 
|-id=048 bgcolor=#E9E9E9
| 284048 ||  || — || January 16, 2005 || Kitt Peak || Spacewatch || — || align=right | 1.3 km || 
|-id=049 bgcolor=#E9E9E9
| 284049 ||  || — || January 16, 2005 || Socorro || LINEAR || AER || align=right | 2.2 km || 
|-id=050 bgcolor=#E9E9E9
| 284050 ||  || — || January 17, 2005 || Kitt Peak || Spacewatch || — || align=right | 1.8 km || 
|-id=051 bgcolor=#E9E9E9
| 284051 ||  || — || January 16, 2005 || Kitt Peak || Spacewatch || — || align=right | 2.7 km || 
|-id=052 bgcolor=#E9E9E9
| 284052 ||  || — || January 18, 2005 || Catalina || CSS || GEF || align=right | 1.9 km || 
|-id=053 bgcolor=#E9E9E9
| 284053 ||  || — || January 16, 2005 || Mauna Kea || C. Veillet || — || align=right | 1.5 km || 
|-id=054 bgcolor=#E9E9E9
| 284054 ||  || — || February 1, 2005 || Catalina || CSS || — || align=right | 1.7 km || 
|-id=055 bgcolor=#E9E9E9
| 284055 ||  || — || February 2, 2005 || Kitt Peak || Spacewatch || — || align=right | 2.3 km || 
|-id=056 bgcolor=#E9E9E9
| 284056 ||  || — || February 2, 2005 || Catalina || CSS || — || align=right | 3.0 km || 
|-id=057 bgcolor=#E9E9E9
| 284057 ||  || — || February 2, 2005 || Socorro || LINEAR || — || align=right | 3.3 km || 
|-id=058 bgcolor=#E9E9E9
| 284058 ||  || — || February 2, 2005 || Kitt Peak || Spacewatch || — || align=right | 3.4 km || 
|-id=059 bgcolor=#E9E9E9
| 284059 ||  || — || February 4, 2005 || Kitt Peak || Spacewatch || — || align=right | 2.2 km || 
|-id=060 bgcolor=#E9E9E9
| 284060 ||  || — || February 2, 2005 || Catalina || CSS || — || align=right | 1.8 km || 
|-id=061 bgcolor=#E9E9E9
| 284061 ||  || — || February 9, 2005 || Mount Lemmon || Mount Lemmon Survey || WIT || align=right | 1.5 km || 
|-id=062 bgcolor=#E9E9E9
| 284062 || 2005 ER || — || March 1, 2005 || Goodricke-Pigott || R. A. Tucker || HNS || align=right | 2.0 km || 
|-id=063 bgcolor=#fefefe
| 284063 ||  || — || March 1, 2005 || Kitt Peak || Spacewatch || H || align=right data-sort-value="0.77" | 770 m || 
|-id=064 bgcolor=#E9E9E9
| 284064 ||  || — || March 2, 2005 || Kitt Peak || Spacewatch || — || align=right | 1.3 km || 
|-id=065 bgcolor=#d6d6d6
| 284065 ||  || — || March 2, 2005 || Catalina || CSS || — || align=right | 4.9 km || 
|-id=066 bgcolor=#E9E9E9
| 284066 ||  || — || March 3, 2005 || Catalina || CSS || — || align=right | 3.7 km || 
|-id=067 bgcolor=#d6d6d6
| 284067 ||  || — || March 8, 2005 || Socorro || LINEAR || — || align=right | 3.9 km || 
|-id=068 bgcolor=#E9E9E9
| 284068 ||  || — || March 4, 2005 || Mount Lemmon || Mount Lemmon Survey || NEM || align=right | 2.8 km || 
|-id=069 bgcolor=#E9E9E9
| 284069 ||  || — || March 8, 2005 || Mount Lemmon || Mount Lemmon Survey || — || align=right | 2.7 km || 
|-id=070 bgcolor=#fefefe
| 284070 ||  || — || March 9, 2005 || Catalina || CSS || H || align=right data-sort-value="0.80" | 800 m || 
|-id=071 bgcolor=#E9E9E9
| 284071 ||  || — || March 9, 2005 || Mount Lemmon || Mount Lemmon Survey || PAD || align=right | 1.7 km || 
|-id=072 bgcolor=#E9E9E9
| 284072 ||  || — || March 11, 2005 || Catalina || CSS || — || align=right | 3.7 km || 
|-id=073 bgcolor=#fefefe
| 284073 ||  || — || March 13, 2005 || Socorro || LINEAR || H || align=right | 1.1 km || 
|-id=074 bgcolor=#E9E9E9
| 284074 ||  || — || March 11, 2005 || Mount Lemmon || Mount Lemmon Survey || — || align=right | 2.2 km || 
|-id=075 bgcolor=#E9E9E9
| 284075 ||  || — || April 2, 2005 || Catalina || CSS || HNS || align=right | 1.5 km || 
|-id=076 bgcolor=#d6d6d6
| 284076 ||  || — || April 6, 2005 || Catalina || CSS || — || align=right | 2.0 km || 
|-id=077 bgcolor=#E9E9E9
| 284077 ||  || — || April 10, 2005 || Kitt Peak || Spacewatch || — || align=right | 2.8 km || 
|-id=078 bgcolor=#d6d6d6
| 284078 ||  || — || April 7, 2005 || Kitt Peak || Spacewatch || — || align=right | 3.8 km || 
|-id=079 bgcolor=#d6d6d6
| 284079 ||  || — || May 3, 2005 || Kitt Peak || Spacewatch || — || align=right | 3.6 km || 
|-id=080 bgcolor=#d6d6d6
| 284080 ||  || — || May 4, 2005 || Kitt Peak || Spacewatch || EOS || align=right | 3.9 km || 
|-id=081 bgcolor=#fefefe
| 284081 ||  || — || May 4, 2005 || Kitt Peak || Spacewatch || — || align=right data-sort-value="0.81" | 810 m || 
|-id=082 bgcolor=#d6d6d6
| 284082 ||  || — || May 10, 2005 || Catalina || CSS || EUP || align=right | 4.1 km || 
|-id=083 bgcolor=#d6d6d6
| 284083 ||  || — || May 10, 2005 || Mount Lemmon || Mount Lemmon Survey || — || align=right | 4.1 km || 
|-id=084 bgcolor=#d6d6d6
| 284084 ||  || — || May 11, 2005 || Palomar || NEAT || TIR || align=right | 3.8 km || 
|-id=085 bgcolor=#d6d6d6
| 284085 ||  || — || May 9, 2005 || Kitt Peak || Spacewatch || EOS || align=right | 2.5 km || 
|-id=086 bgcolor=#d6d6d6
| 284086 ||  || — || June 1, 2005 || Reedy Creek || J. Broughton || — || align=right | 4.5 km || 
|-id=087 bgcolor=#d6d6d6
| 284087 ||  || — || June 6, 2005 || Kitt Peak || Spacewatch || THM || align=right | 2.4 km || 
|-id=088 bgcolor=#d6d6d6
| 284088 ||  || — || June 10, 2005 || Kitt Peak || Spacewatch || HYG || align=right | 3.6 km || 
|-id=089 bgcolor=#d6d6d6
| 284089 ||  || — || June 11, 2005 || Kitt Peak || Spacewatch || — || align=right | 3.6 km || 
|-id=090 bgcolor=#d6d6d6
| 284090 ||  || — || June 11, 2005 || Kitt Peak || Spacewatch || NAE || align=right | 3.6 km || 
|-id=091 bgcolor=#d6d6d6
| 284091 ||  || — || June 16, 2005 || Kitt Peak || Spacewatch || — || align=right | 3.7 km || 
|-id=092 bgcolor=#d6d6d6
| 284092 ||  || — || June 29, 2005 || Kitt Peak || Spacewatch || — || align=right | 4.2 km || 
|-id=093 bgcolor=#d6d6d6
| 284093 ||  || — || June 29, 2005 || Kitt Peak || Spacewatch || — || align=right | 5.5 km || 
|-id=094 bgcolor=#d6d6d6
| 284094 ||  || — || June 29, 2005 || Palomar || NEAT || EUP || align=right | 4.1 km || 
|-id=095 bgcolor=#d6d6d6
| 284095 ||  || — || June 29, 2005 || Kitt Peak || Spacewatch || — || align=right | 3.5 km || 
|-id=096 bgcolor=#fefefe
| 284096 ||  || — || July 3, 2005 || Palomar || NEAT || — || align=right data-sort-value="0.89" | 890 m || 
|-id=097 bgcolor=#d6d6d6
| 284097 ||  || — || July 4, 2005 || Kitt Peak || Spacewatch || — || align=right | 3.6 km || 
|-id=098 bgcolor=#d6d6d6
| 284098 ||  || — || July 3, 2005 || Mount Lemmon || Mount Lemmon Survey || — || align=right | 4.2 km || 
|-id=099 bgcolor=#d6d6d6
| 284099 ||  || — || July 31, 2005 || Palomar || NEAT || — || align=right | 5.0 km || 
|-id=100 bgcolor=#fefefe
| 284100 ||  || — || August 28, 2005 || Kitt Peak || Spacewatch || — || align=right data-sort-value="0.67" | 670 m || 
|}

284101–284200 

|-bgcolor=#d6d6d6
| 284101 ||  || — || August 28, 2005 || Siding Spring || SSS || MEL || align=right | 5.9 km || 
|-id=102 bgcolor=#fefefe
| 284102 ||  || — || August 29, 2005 || Kitt Peak || Spacewatch || — || align=right data-sort-value="0.60" | 600 m || 
|-id=103 bgcolor=#fefefe
| 284103 ||  || — || August 30, 2005 || Palomar || NEAT || FLO || align=right data-sort-value="0.72" | 720 m || 
|-id=104 bgcolor=#d6d6d6
| 284104 ||  || — || September 3, 2005 || Palomar || NEAT || MEL || align=right | 6.1 km || 
|-id=105 bgcolor=#fefefe
| 284105 ||  || — || September 26, 2005 || Kitt Peak || Spacewatch || — || align=right data-sort-value="0.60" | 600 m || 
|-id=106 bgcolor=#d6d6d6
| 284106 ||  || — || September 24, 2005 || Kitt Peak || Spacewatch || — || align=right | 2.7 km || 
|-id=107 bgcolor=#fefefe
| 284107 ||  || — || September 29, 2005 || Mount Lemmon || Mount Lemmon Survey || FLO || align=right data-sort-value="0.61" | 610 m || 
|-id=108 bgcolor=#fefefe
| 284108 ||  || — || September 29, 2005 || Kitt Peak || Spacewatch || — || align=right data-sort-value="0.76" | 760 m || 
|-id=109 bgcolor=#fefefe
| 284109 ||  || — || September 26, 2005 || Palomar || NEAT || FLO || align=right data-sort-value="0.66" | 660 m || 
|-id=110 bgcolor=#E9E9E9
| 284110 ||  || — || September 22, 2005 || Apache Point || A. C. Becker || AER || align=right | 1.4 km || 
|-id=111 bgcolor=#fefefe
| 284111 ||  || — || October 1, 2005 || Kitt Peak || Spacewatch || NYS || align=right data-sort-value="0.89" | 890 m || 
|-id=112 bgcolor=#E9E9E9
| 284112 ||  || — || October 2, 2005 || Mount Lemmon || Mount Lemmon Survey || EUN || align=right | 1.2 km || 
|-id=113 bgcolor=#fefefe
| 284113 ||  || — || October 5, 2005 || Mount Lemmon || Mount Lemmon Survey || NYS || align=right data-sort-value="0.83" | 830 m || 
|-id=114 bgcolor=#FFC2E0
| 284114 ||  || — || October 13, 2005 || Anderson Mesa || LONEOS || AMO +1kmcritical || align=right data-sort-value="0.93" | 930 m || 
|-id=115 bgcolor=#E9E9E9
| 284115 ||  || — || October 13, 2005 || Socorro || LINEAR || IAN || align=right | 1.0 km || 
|-id=116 bgcolor=#fefefe
| 284116 ||  || — || October 24, 2005 || Kitt Peak || Spacewatch || — || align=right data-sort-value="0.91" | 910 m || 
|-id=117 bgcolor=#E9E9E9
| 284117 ||  || — || October 25, 2005 || Catalina || CSS || MAR || align=right | 1.7 km || 
|-id=118 bgcolor=#fefefe
| 284118 ||  || — || October 22, 2005 || Kitt Peak || Spacewatch || — || align=right data-sort-value="0.90" | 900 m || 
|-id=119 bgcolor=#fefefe
| 284119 ||  || — || October 24, 2005 || Palomar || NEAT || — || align=right | 1.2 km || 
|-id=120 bgcolor=#fefefe
| 284120 ||  || — || October 27, 2005 || Mount Lemmon || Mount Lemmon Survey || — || align=right data-sort-value="0.73" | 730 m || 
|-id=121 bgcolor=#fefefe
| 284121 ||  || — || October 25, 2005 || Kitt Peak || Spacewatch || — || align=right data-sort-value="0.88" | 880 m || 
|-id=122 bgcolor=#fefefe
| 284122 ||  || — || October 25, 2005 || Kitt Peak || Spacewatch || — || align=right data-sort-value="0.79" | 790 m || 
|-id=123 bgcolor=#fefefe
| 284123 ||  || — || October 25, 2005 || Kitt Peak || Spacewatch || FLO || align=right data-sort-value="0.68" | 680 m || 
|-id=124 bgcolor=#fefefe
| 284124 ||  || — || October 25, 2005 || Kitt Peak || Spacewatch || FLO || align=right data-sort-value="0.70" | 700 m || 
|-id=125 bgcolor=#fefefe
| 284125 ||  || — || October 25, 2005 || Kitt Peak || Spacewatch || — || align=right data-sort-value="0.60" | 600 m || 
|-id=126 bgcolor=#d6d6d6
| 284126 ||  || — || October 25, 2005 || Kitt Peak || Spacewatch || 3:2 || align=right | 5.9 km || 
|-id=127 bgcolor=#fefefe
| 284127 ||  || — || October 27, 2005 || Kitt Peak || Spacewatch || — || align=right data-sort-value="0.55" | 550 m || 
|-id=128 bgcolor=#fefefe
| 284128 ||  || — || October 27, 2005 || Kitt Peak || Spacewatch || — || align=right data-sort-value="0.69" | 690 m || 
|-id=129 bgcolor=#E9E9E9
| 284129 ||  || — || October 27, 2005 || Socorro || LINEAR || — || align=right | 1.8 km || 
|-id=130 bgcolor=#E9E9E9
| 284130 ||  || — || October 30, 2005 || Mount Lemmon || Mount Lemmon Survey || MAR || align=right | 2.1 km || 
|-id=131 bgcolor=#fefefe
| 284131 ||  || — || October 30, 2005 || Kitt Peak || Spacewatch || — || align=right data-sort-value="0.88" | 880 m || 
|-id=132 bgcolor=#fefefe
| 284132 ||  || — || October 27, 2005 || Kitt Peak || Spacewatch || — || align=right data-sort-value="0.81" | 810 m || 
|-id=133 bgcolor=#fefefe
| 284133 ||  || — || October 24, 2005 || Mauna Kea || D. J. Tholen || — || align=right data-sort-value="0.76" | 760 m || 
|-id=134 bgcolor=#fefefe
| 284134 ||  || — || November 3, 2005 || Mount Lemmon || Mount Lemmon Survey || FLO || align=right data-sort-value="0.61" | 610 m || 
|-id=135 bgcolor=#fefefe
| 284135 ||  || — || November 4, 2005 || Mount Lemmon || Mount Lemmon Survey || V || align=right data-sort-value="0.66" | 660 m || 
|-id=136 bgcolor=#fefefe
| 284136 ||  || — || November 4, 2005 || Socorro || LINEAR || — || align=right data-sort-value="0.89" | 890 m || 
|-id=137 bgcolor=#fefefe
| 284137 ||  || — || November 6, 2005 || Kitt Peak || Spacewatch || FLO || align=right data-sort-value="0.63" | 630 m || 
|-id=138 bgcolor=#fefefe
| 284138 ||  || — || November 5, 2005 || Kitt Peak || Spacewatch || — || align=right data-sort-value="0.94" | 940 m || 
|-id=139 bgcolor=#fefefe
| 284139 ||  || — || November 21, 2005 || Catalina || CSS || — || align=right data-sort-value="0.80" | 800 m || 
|-id=140 bgcolor=#fefefe
| 284140 ||  || — || November 22, 2005 || Kitt Peak || Spacewatch || — || align=right data-sort-value="0.80" | 800 m || 
|-id=141 bgcolor=#fefefe
| 284141 ||  || — || November 22, 2005 || Kitt Peak || Spacewatch || — || align=right data-sort-value="0.75" | 750 m || 
|-id=142 bgcolor=#fefefe
| 284142 ||  || — || November 21, 2005 || Catalina || CSS || — || align=right data-sort-value="0.74" | 740 m || 
|-id=143 bgcolor=#fefefe
| 284143 ||  || — || November 21, 2005 || Kitt Peak || Spacewatch || — || align=right data-sort-value="0.98" | 980 m || 
|-id=144 bgcolor=#fefefe
| 284144 ||  || — || November 25, 2005 || Kitt Peak || Spacewatch || — || align=right data-sort-value="0.87" | 870 m || 
|-id=145 bgcolor=#fefefe
| 284145 ||  || — || November 22, 2005 || Kitt Peak || Spacewatch || — || align=right | 1.0 km || 
|-id=146 bgcolor=#fefefe
| 284146 ||  || — || November 22, 2005 || Kitt Peak || Spacewatch || — || align=right data-sort-value="0.85" | 850 m || 
|-id=147 bgcolor=#fefefe
| 284147 ||  || — || November 22, 2005 || Kitt Peak || Spacewatch || — || align=right | 1.2 km || 
|-id=148 bgcolor=#fefefe
| 284148 ||  || — || November 25, 2005 || Mount Lemmon || Mount Lemmon Survey || — || align=right | 1.0 km || 
|-id=149 bgcolor=#E9E9E9
| 284149 ||  || — || November 28, 2005 || Socorro || LINEAR || EUN || align=right | 1.9 km || 
|-id=150 bgcolor=#fefefe
| 284150 ||  || — || November 24, 2005 || Palomar || NEAT || — || align=right | 3.2 km || 
|-id=151 bgcolor=#fefefe
| 284151 ||  || — || November 28, 2005 || Catalina || CSS || — || align=right | 1.1 km || 
|-id=152 bgcolor=#FA8072
| 284152 ||  || — || December 1, 2005 || Palomar || NEAT || — || align=right | 4.1 km || 
|-id=153 bgcolor=#fefefe
| 284153 ||  || — || December 4, 2005 || Kitt Peak || Spacewatch || V || align=right data-sort-value="0.80" | 800 m || 
|-id=154 bgcolor=#fefefe
| 284154 ||  || — || December 8, 2005 || Kitt Peak || Spacewatch || — || align=right data-sort-value="0.74" | 740 m || 
|-id=155 bgcolor=#fefefe
| 284155 ||  || — || December 22, 2005 || Kitt Peak || Spacewatch || V || align=right data-sort-value="0.72" | 720 m || 
|-id=156 bgcolor=#fefefe
| 284156 ||  || — || December 24, 2005 || Kitt Peak || Spacewatch || — || align=right data-sort-value="0.93" | 930 m || 
|-id=157 bgcolor=#fefefe
| 284157 ||  || — || December 25, 2005 || Kitt Peak || Spacewatch || — || align=right | 1.0 km || 
|-id=158 bgcolor=#fefefe
| 284158 ||  || — || December 24, 2005 || Kitt Peak || Spacewatch || MAS || align=right | 1.0 km || 
|-id=159 bgcolor=#fefefe
| 284159 ||  || — || December 25, 2005 || Kitt Peak || Spacewatch || V || align=right | 1.0 km || 
|-id=160 bgcolor=#fefefe
| 284160 ||  || — || December 22, 2005 || Kitt Peak || Spacewatch || V || align=right data-sort-value="0.89" | 890 m || 
|-id=161 bgcolor=#fefefe
| 284161 ||  || — || December 25, 2005 || Kitt Peak || Spacewatch || — || align=right | 1.0 km || 
|-id=162 bgcolor=#E9E9E9
| 284162 ||  || — || December 26, 2005 || Kitt Peak || Spacewatch || — || align=right | 2.4 km || 
|-id=163 bgcolor=#E9E9E9
| 284163 ||  || — || December 24, 2005 || Kitt Peak || Spacewatch || — || align=right | 2.1 km || 
|-id=164 bgcolor=#fefefe
| 284164 ||  || — || December 24, 2005 || Kitt Peak || Spacewatch || — || align=right | 1.2 km || 
|-id=165 bgcolor=#fefefe
| 284165 ||  || — || December 25, 2005 || Mount Lemmon || Mount Lemmon Survey || — || align=right | 1.2 km || 
|-id=166 bgcolor=#fefefe
| 284166 ||  || — || December 25, 2005 || Kitt Peak || Spacewatch || — || align=right | 1.0 km || 
|-id=167 bgcolor=#fefefe
| 284167 ||  || — || December 24, 2005 || Kitt Peak || Spacewatch || — || align=right data-sort-value="0.81" | 810 m || 
|-id=168 bgcolor=#fefefe
| 284168 ||  || — || December 26, 2005 || Kitt Peak || Spacewatch || FLO || align=right data-sort-value="0.72" | 720 m || 
|-id=169 bgcolor=#fefefe
| 284169 ||  || — || December 27, 2005 || Kitt Peak || Spacewatch || — || align=right data-sort-value="0.90" | 900 m || 
|-id=170 bgcolor=#fefefe
| 284170 ||  || — || December 27, 2005 || Kitt Peak || Spacewatch || V || align=right data-sort-value="0.82" | 820 m || 
|-id=171 bgcolor=#fefefe
| 284171 ||  || — || December 29, 2005 || Kitt Peak || Spacewatch || — || align=right data-sort-value="0.91" | 910 m || 
|-id=172 bgcolor=#fefefe
| 284172 ||  || — || December 28, 2005 || Catalina || CSS || V || align=right data-sort-value="0.88" | 880 m || 
|-id=173 bgcolor=#C2FFFF
| 284173 ||  || — || December 26, 2005 || Mount Lemmon || Mount Lemmon Survey || L5 || align=right | 11 km || 
|-id=174 bgcolor=#E9E9E9
| 284174 ||  || — || January 2, 2006 || Mount Lemmon || Mount Lemmon Survey || — || align=right | 3.1 km || 
|-id=175 bgcolor=#fefefe
| 284175 ||  || — || January 5, 2006 || Mount Lemmon || Mount Lemmon Survey || — || align=right | 1.0 km || 
|-id=176 bgcolor=#fefefe
| 284176 ||  || — || January 6, 2006 || Kitt Peak || Spacewatch || — || align=right | 1.1 km || 
|-id=177 bgcolor=#fefefe
| 284177 ||  || — || January 4, 2006 || Kitt Peak || Spacewatch || NYS || align=right data-sort-value="0.86" | 860 m || 
|-id=178 bgcolor=#fefefe
| 284178 ||  || — || January 7, 2006 || Mount Lemmon || Mount Lemmon Survey || — || align=right data-sort-value="0.82" | 820 m || 
|-id=179 bgcolor=#E9E9E9
| 284179 ||  || — || January 8, 2006 || Mount Lemmon || Mount Lemmon Survey || — || align=right | 2.2 km || 
|-id=180 bgcolor=#fefefe
| 284180 ||  || — || January 8, 2006 || Mount Lemmon || Mount Lemmon Survey || — || align=right | 1.1 km || 
|-id=181 bgcolor=#fefefe
| 284181 ||  || — || January 7, 2006 || Mount Lemmon || Mount Lemmon Survey || — || align=right data-sort-value="0.94" | 940 m || 
|-id=182 bgcolor=#E9E9E9
| 284182 ||  || — || January 6, 2006 || Kitt Peak || Spacewatch || AGN || align=right | 1.2 km || 
|-id=183 bgcolor=#fefefe
| 284183 ||  || — || January 7, 2006 || Socorro || LINEAR || — || align=right data-sort-value="0.74" | 740 m || 
|-id=184 bgcolor=#C2FFFF
| 284184 ||  || — || January 8, 2006 || Mount Lemmon || Mount Lemmon Survey || L5 || align=right | 13 km || 
|-id=185 bgcolor=#fefefe
| 284185 ||  || — || January 4, 2006 || Kitt Peak || Spacewatch || — || align=right | 1.2 km || 
|-id=186 bgcolor=#fefefe
| 284186 ||  || — || January 9, 2006 || Kitt Peak || Spacewatch || MAS || align=right | 1.1 km || 
|-id=187 bgcolor=#fefefe
| 284187 ||  || — || January 5, 2006 || Socorro || LINEAR || — || align=right | 1.2 km || 
|-id=188 bgcolor=#fefefe
| 284188 ||  || — || January 7, 2006 || Mount Lemmon || Mount Lemmon Survey || NYS || align=right | 1.1 km || 
|-id=189 bgcolor=#fefefe
| 284189 ||  || — || January 7, 2006 || Mount Lemmon || Mount Lemmon Survey || — || align=right | 1.0 km || 
|-id=190 bgcolor=#E9E9E9
| 284190 ||  || — || January 20, 2006 || Kitt Peak || Spacewatch || — || align=right | 3.2 km || 
|-id=191 bgcolor=#fefefe
| 284191 ||  || — || January 21, 2006 || Kitt Peak || Spacewatch || NYS || align=right data-sort-value="0.66" | 660 m || 
|-id=192 bgcolor=#C2FFFF
| 284192 ||  || — || January 21, 2006 || Kitt Peak || Spacewatch || L5 || align=right | 13 km || 
|-id=193 bgcolor=#E9E9E9
| 284193 ||  || — || January 22, 2006 || Anderson Mesa || LONEOS || GEF || align=right | 1.6 km || 
|-id=194 bgcolor=#fefefe
| 284194 ||  || — || January 23, 2006 || Socorro || LINEAR || — || align=right | 1.2 km || 
|-id=195 bgcolor=#fefefe
| 284195 ||  || — || January 23, 2006 || Mount Lemmon || Mount Lemmon Survey || — || align=right | 1.1 km || 
|-id=196 bgcolor=#E9E9E9
| 284196 ||  || — || January 20, 2006 || Kitt Peak || Spacewatch || — || align=right | 1.2 km || 
|-id=197 bgcolor=#fefefe
| 284197 ||  || — || January 26, 2006 || Kitt Peak || Spacewatch || — || align=right | 1.2 km || 
|-id=198 bgcolor=#fefefe
| 284198 ||  || — || January 26, 2006 || Kitt Peak || Spacewatch || — || align=right | 1.4 km || 
|-id=199 bgcolor=#fefefe
| 284199 ||  || — || January 26, 2006 || Kitt Peak || Spacewatch || — || align=right | 1.4 km || 
|-id=200 bgcolor=#fefefe
| 284200 ||  || — || January 26, 2006 || Mount Lemmon || Mount Lemmon Survey || — || align=right | 1.1 km || 
|}

284201–284300 

|-bgcolor=#fefefe
| 284201 ||  || — || January 27, 2006 || Mount Lemmon || Mount Lemmon Survey || CLA || align=right | 1.6 km || 
|-id=202 bgcolor=#fefefe
| 284202 ||  || — || January 27, 2006 || Mount Lemmon || Mount Lemmon Survey || V || align=right data-sort-value="0.84" | 840 m || 
|-id=203 bgcolor=#E9E9E9
| 284203 ||  || — || January 28, 2006 || Mount Lemmon || Mount Lemmon Survey || — || align=right | 2.5 km || 
|-id=204 bgcolor=#C2FFFF
| 284204 ||  || — || January 30, 2006 || Kitt Peak || Spacewatch || L5 || align=right | 12 km || 
|-id=205 bgcolor=#fefefe
| 284205 ||  || — || January 30, 2006 || Kitt Peak || Spacewatch || V || align=right data-sort-value="0.86" | 860 m || 
|-id=206 bgcolor=#fefefe
| 284206 ||  || — || January 30, 2006 || Kitt Peak || Spacewatch || — || align=right data-sort-value="0.91" | 910 m || 
|-id=207 bgcolor=#fefefe
| 284207 ||  || — || January 31, 2006 || Kitt Peak || Spacewatch || V || align=right data-sort-value="0.95" | 950 m || 
|-id=208 bgcolor=#fefefe
| 284208 ||  || — || January 31, 2006 || Kitt Peak || Spacewatch || NYS || align=right | 1.0 km || 
|-id=209 bgcolor=#E9E9E9
| 284209 ||  || — || January 28, 2006 || Mount Lemmon || Mount Lemmon Survey || — || align=right | 1.9 km || 
|-id=210 bgcolor=#fefefe
| 284210 ||  || — || January 30, 2006 || Kitt Peak || Spacewatch || NYS || align=right data-sort-value="0.75" | 750 m || 
|-id=211 bgcolor=#fefefe
| 284211 ||  || — || January 31, 2006 || Kitt Peak || Spacewatch || — || align=right | 1.4 km || 
|-id=212 bgcolor=#fefefe
| 284212 ||  || — || January 31, 2006 || Kitt Peak || Spacewatch || — || align=right | 1.2 km || 
|-id=213 bgcolor=#fefefe
| 284213 ||  || — || January 31, 2006 || Kitt Peak || Spacewatch || — || align=right data-sort-value="0.91" | 910 m || 
|-id=214 bgcolor=#fefefe
| 284214 ||  || — || January 31, 2006 || Kitt Peak || Spacewatch || V || align=right data-sort-value="0.73" | 730 m || 
|-id=215 bgcolor=#E9E9E9
| 284215 ||  || — || January 28, 2006 || Catalina || CSS || — || align=right | 1.4 km || 
|-id=216 bgcolor=#E9E9E9
| 284216 ||  || — || February 1, 2006 || Mount Lemmon || Mount Lemmon Survey || — || align=right | 1.3 km || 
|-id=217 bgcolor=#C2FFFF
| 284217 ||  || — || February 1, 2006 || Mount Lemmon || Mount Lemmon Survey || L5 || align=right | 14 km || 
|-id=218 bgcolor=#fefefe
| 284218 ||  || — || February 2, 2006 || Kitt Peak || Spacewatch || — || align=right | 1.2 km || 
|-id=219 bgcolor=#C2FFFF
| 284219 ||  || — || February 2, 2006 || Mount Lemmon || Mount Lemmon Survey || L5 || align=right | 11 km || 
|-id=220 bgcolor=#E9E9E9
| 284220 ||  || — || February 3, 2006 || Socorro || LINEAR || — || align=right | 1.1 km || 
|-id=221 bgcolor=#fefefe
| 284221 ||  || — || February 4, 2006 || Kitt Peak || Spacewatch || — || align=right data-sort-value="0.96" | 960 m || 
|-id=222 bgcolor=#E9E9E9
| 284222 ||  || — || February 20, 2006 || Kitt Peak || Spacewatch || RAF || align=right data-sort-value="0.92" | 920 m || 
|-id=223 bgcolor=#E9E9E9
| 284223 ||  || — || February 21, 2006 || Catalina || CSS || EUN || align=right | 1.6 km || 
|-id=224 bgcolor=#E9E9E9
| 284224 ||  || — || February 20, 2006 || Kitt Peak || Spacewatch || — || align=right | 1.4 km || 
|-id=225 bgcolor=#fefefe
| 284225 ||  || — || February 20, 2006 || Kitt Peak || Spacewatch || — || align=right data-sort-value="0.88" | 880 m || 
|-id=226 bgcolor=#C2FFFF
| 284226 ||  || — || February 20, 2006 || Catalina || CSS || L5ENM || align=right | 13 km || 
|-id=227 bgcolor=#fefefe
| 284227 ||  || — || February 24, 2006 || Kitt Peak || Spacewatch || V || align=right data-sort-value="0.74" | 740 m || 
|-id=228 bgcolor=#fefefe
| 284228 ||  || — || February 24, 2006 || Mount Lemmon || Mount Lemmon Survey || NYS || align=right data-sort-value="0.69" | 690 m || 
|-id=229 bgcolor=#E9E9E9
| 284229 ||  || — || February 22, 2006 || Catalina || CSS || — || align=right | 1.8 km || 
|-id=230 bgcolor=#fefefe
| 284230 ||  || — || February 21, 2006 || Catalina || CSS || H || align=right data-sort-value="0.70" | 700 m || 
|-id=231 bgcolor=#fefefe
| 284231 ||  || — || February 21, 2006 || Mount Lemmon || Mount Lemmon Survey || — || align=right | 1.4 km || 
|-id=232 bgcolor=#E9E9E9
| 284232 ||  || — || February 23, 2006 || Kitt Peak || Spacewatch || — || align=right | 1.0 km || 
|-id=233 bgcolor=#fefefe
| 284233 ||  || — || February 24, 2006 || Kitt Peak || Spacewatch || — || align=right | 1.0 km || 
|-id=234 bgcolor=#E9E9E9
| 284234 ||  || — || February 27, 2006 || Mount Lemmon || Mount Lemmon Survey || — || align=right | 1.1 km || 
|-id=235 bgcolor=#d6d6d6
| 284235 ||  || — || February 27, 2006 || Kitt Peak || Spacewatch || — || align=right | 3.1 km || 
|-id=236 bgcolor=#d6d6d6
| 284236 ||  || — || February 24, 2006 || Kitt Peak || Spacewatch || KAR || align=right | 1.4 km || 
|-id=237 bgcolor=#fefefe
| 284237 ||  || — || February 25, 2006 || Kitt Peak || Spacewatch || — || align=right | 1.0 km || 
|-id=238 bgcolor=#E9E9E9
| 284238 ||  || — || February 27, 2006 || Kitt Peak || Spacewatch || — || align=right | 1.6 km || 
|-id=239 bgcolor=#fefefe
| 284239 ||  || — || February 27, 2006 || Kitt Peak || Spacewatch || NYS || align=right data-sort-value="0.96" | 960 m || 
|-id=240 bgcolor=#E9E9E9
| 284240 ||  || — || February 27, 2006 || Kitt Peak || Spacewatch || — || align=right | 1.2 km || 
|-id=241 bgcolor=#d6d6d6
| 284241 ||  || — || February 24, 2006 || Kitt Peak || Spacewatch || — || align=right | 2.4 km || 
|-id=242 bgcolor=#fefefe
| 284242 ||  || — || March 2, 2006 || Kitt Peak || Spacewatch || MAS || align=right data-sort-value="0.93" | 930 m || 
|-id=243 bgcolor=#E9E9E9
| 284243 ||  || — || March 2, 2006 || Kitt Peak || Spacewatch || — || align=right | 1.3 km || 
|-id=244 bgcolor=#E9E9E9
| 284244 ||  || — || March 2, 2006 || Mount Lemmon || Mount Lemmon Survey || — || align=right | 3.3 km || 
|-id=245 bgcolor=#E9E9E9
| 284245 ||  || — || March 3, 2006 || Kitt Peak || Spacewatch || RAF || align=right data-sort-value="0.93" | 930 m || 
|-id=246 bgcolor=#E9E9E9
| 284246 ||  || — || March 4, 2006 || Kitt Peak || Spacewatch || — || align=right | 1.0 km || 
|-id=247 bgcolor=#E9E9E9
| 284247 ||  || — || March 4, 2006 || Kitt Peak || Spacewatch || — || align=right data-sort-value="0.90" | 900 m || 
|-id=248 bgcolor=#E9E9E9
| 284248 ||  || — || March 5, 2006 || Socorro || LINEAR || JUN || align=right | 1.9 km || 
|-id=249 bgcolor=#E9E9E9
| 284249 ||  || — || March 4, 2006 || Kitt Peak || Spacewatch || — || align=right data-sort-value="0.92" | 920 m || 
|-id=250 bgcolor=#E9E9E9
| 284250 ||  || — || March 24, 2006 || Mount Lemmon || Mount Lemmon Survey || — || align=right | 1.4 km || 
|-id=251 bgcolor=#E9E9E9
| 284251 ||  || — || March 21, 2006 || Socorro || LINEAR || — || align=right | 3.1 km || 
|-id=252 bgcolor=#d6d6d6
| 284252 ||  || — || March 22, 2006 || Socorro || LINEAR || — || align=right | 3.9 km || 
|-id=253 bgcolor=#E9E9E9
| 284253 ||  || — || March 25, 2006 || Catalina || CSS || JUN || align=right | 1.8 km || 
|-id=254 bgcolor=#E9E9E9
| 284254 ||  || — || April 2, 2006 || Kitt Peak || Spacewatch || — || align=right | 2.8 km || 
|-id=255 bgcolor=#E9E9E9
| 284255 ||  || — || April 2, 2006 || Kitt Peak || Spacewatch || — || align=right | 1.4 km || 
|-id=256 bgcolor=#E9E9E9
| 284256 ||  || — || April 2, 2006 || Kitt Peak || Spacewatch || — || align=right | 1.4 km || 
|-id=257 bgcolor=#E9E9E9
| 284257 ||  || — || April 2, 2006 || Kitt Peak || Spacewatch || HEN || align=right | 1.3 km || 
|-id=258 bgcolor=#E9E9E9
| 284258 ||  || — || April 2, 2006 || Kitt Peak || Spacewatch || — || align=right | 2.2 km || 
|-id=259 bgcolor=#E9E9E9
| 284259 ||  || — || April 2, 2006 || Kitt Peak || Spacewatch || — || align=right | 1.1 km || 
|-id=260 bgcolor=#E9E9E9
| 284260 ||  || — || April 7, 2006 || Kitt Peak || Spacewatch || — || align=right | 1.5 km || 
|-id=261 bgcolor=#E9E9E9
| 284261 ||  || — || April 7, 2006 || Anderson Mesa || LONEOS || — || align=right | 2.3 km || 
|-id=262 bgcolor=#E9E9E9
| 284262 ||  || — || April 7, 2006 || Siding Spring || SSS || — || align=right | 2.1 km || 
|-id=263 bgcolor=#E9E9E9
| 284263 ||  || — || April 19, 2006 || Anderson Mesa || LONEOS || — || align=right | 2.5 km || 
|-id=264 bgcolor=#E9E9E9
| 284264 ||  || — || April 19, 2006 || Kitt Peak || Spacewatch || — || align=right | 1.6 km || 
|-id=265 bgcolor=#E9E9E9
| 284265 ||  || — || April 20, 2006 || Kitt Peak || Spacewatch || — || align=right | 2.0 km || 
|-id=266 bgcolor=#d6d6d6
| 284266 ||  || — || April 20, 2006 || Kitt Peak || Spacewatch || TIR || align=right | 3.0 km || 
|-id=267 bgcolor=#d6d6d6
| 284267 ||  || — || April 25, 2006 || Kitt Peak || Spacewatch || — || align=right | 3.0 km || 
|-id=268 bgcolor=#E9E9E9
| 284268 ||  || — || April 25, 2006 || Kitt Peak || Spacewatch || PAE || align=right | 2.7 km || 
|-id=269 bgcolor=#d6d6d6
| 284269 ||  || — || April 26, 2006 || Kitt Peak || Spacewatch || — || align=right | 4.4 km || 
|-id=270 bgcolor=#d6d6d6
| 284270 ||  || — || April 18, 2006 || Palomar || NEAT || — || align=right | 4.0 km || 
|-id=271 bgcolor=#E9E9E9
| 284271 ||  || — || April 26, 2006 || Anderson Mesa || LONEOS || 526 || align=right | 2.5 km || 
|-id=272 bgcolor=#E9E9E9
| 284272 ||  || — || April 30, 2006 || Kitt Peak || Spacewatch || — || align=right | 1.5 km || 
|-id=273 bgcolor=#E9E9E9
| 284273 ||  || — || April 30, 2006 || Kitt Peak || Spacewatch || — || align=right | 2.2 km || 
|-id=274 bgcolor=#E9E9E9
| 284274 ||  || — || April 30, 2006 || Kitt Peak || Spacewatch || — || align=right | 1.7 km || 
|-id=275 bgcolor=#E9E9E9
| 284275 ||  || — || May 2, 2006 || Mount Lemmon || Mount Lemmon Survey || — || align=right | 2.5 km || 
|-id=276 bgcolor=#E9E9E9
| 284276 ||  || — || May 1, 2006 || Kitt Peak || Spacewatch || — || align=right | 2.2 km || 
|-id=277 bgcolor=#E9E9E9
| 284277 ||  || — || May 1, 2006 || Kitt Peak || Spacewatch || — || align=right | 1.5 km || 
|-id=278 bgcolor=#E9E9E9
| 284278 ||  || — || May 1, 2006 || Kitt Peak || Spacewatch || — || align=right | 1.1 km || 
|-id=279 bgcolor=#E9E9E9
| 284279 ||  || — || May 7, 2006 || Kitt Peak || Spacewatch || — || align=right | 2.0 km || 
|-id=280 bgcolor=#E9E9E9
| 284280 ||  || — || May 6, 2006 || Kitt Peak || Spacewatch || — || align=right | 1.7 km || 
|-id=281 bgcolor=#E9E9E9
| 284281 ||  || — || May 8, 2006 || Siding Spring || SSS || RAF || align=right | 1.2 km || 
|-id=282 bgcolor=#d6d6d6
| 284282 ||  || — || May 5, 2006 || Kitt Peak || Spacewatch || — || align=right | 3.7 km || 
|-id=283 bgcolor=#d6d6d6
| 284283 ||  || — || May 2, 2006 || Mount Lemmon || Mount Lemmon Survey || — || align=right | 2.7 km || 
|-id=284 bgcolor=#E9E9E9
| 284284 ||  || — || May 14, 2006 || Palomar || NEAT || — || align=right | 2.8 km || 
|-id=285 bgcolor=#E9E9E9
| 284285 ||  || — || May 20, 2006 || Kitt Peak || Spacewatch || MAR || align=right | 1.5 km || 
|-id=286 bgcolor=#E9E9E9
| 284286 ||  || — || May 19, 2006 || Mount Lemmon || Mount Lemmon Survey || MRX || align=right | 1.3 km || 
|-id=287 bgcolor=#E9E9E9
| 284287 ||  || — || May 20, 2006 || Catalina || CSS || — || align=right | 3.2 km || 
|-id=288 bgcolor=#E9E9E9
| 284288 ||  || — || May 20, 2006 || Kitt Peak || Spacewatch || EUN || align=right | 1.3 km || 
|-id=289 bgcolor=#E9E9E9
| 284289 ||  || — || May 20, 2006 || Siding Spring || SSS || GAL || align=right | 2.1 km || 
|-id=290 bgcolor=#E9E9E9
| 284290 ||  || — || May 22, 2006 || Kitt Peak || Spacewatch || — || align=right | 2.1 km || 
|-id=291 bgcolor=#E9E9E9
| 284291 ||  || — || May 22, 2006 || Kitt Peak || Spacewatch || GEF || align=right | 1.4 km || 
|-id=292 bgcolor=#E9E9E9
| 284292 ||  || — || May 23, 2006 || Anderson Mesa || LONEOS || — || align=right | 2.6 km || 
|-id=293 bgcolor=#E9E9E9
| 284293 ||  || — || May 25, 2006 || Kitt Peak || Spacewatch || — || align=right | 1.4 km || 
|-id=294 bgcolor=#E9E9E9
| 284294 ||  || — || May 29, 2006 || Reedy Creek || J. Broughton || — || align=right | 3.2 km || 
|-id=295 bgcolor=#E9E9E9
| 284295 ||  || — || May 30, 2006 || Nyukasa || Mount Nyukasa Stn. || — || align=right | 2.8 km || 
|-id=296 bgcolor=#E9E9E9
| 284296 ||  || — || May 31, 2006 || Mount Lemmon || Mount Lemmon Survey || — || align=right | 1.2 km || 
|-id=297 bgcolor=#E9E9E9
| 284297 ||  || — || May 29, 2006 || Kitt Peak || Spacewatch || WIT || align=right | 1.2 km || 
|-id=298 bgcolor=#E9E9E9
| 284298 ||  || — || May 31, 2006 || Kitt Peak || Spacewatch || — || align=right | 1.6 km || 
|-id=299 bgcolor=#E9E9E9
| 284299 ||  || — || May 20, 2006 || Mount Lemmon || Mount Lemmon Survey || HEN || align=right | 1.3 km || 
|-id=300 bgcolor=#E9E9E9
| 284300 ||  || — || May 18, 2006 || Palomar || NEAT || HNA || align=right | 3.0 km || 
|}

284301–284400 

|-bgcolor=#d6d6d6
| 284301 ||  || — || July 24, 2006 || Marly || Naef Obs. || — || align=right | 3.7 km || 
|-id=302 bgcolor=#E9E9E9
| 284302 ||  || — || July 30, 2006 || Reedy Creek || J. Broughton || — || align=right | 3.2 km || 
|-id=303 bgcolor=#d6d6d6
| 284303 ||  || — || August 14, 2006 || Siding Spring || SSS || — || align=right | 3.9 km || 
|-id=304 bgcolor=#d6d6d6
| 284304 ||  || — || August 12, 2006 || Palomar || NEAT || — || align=right | 4.1 km || 
|-id=305 bgcolor=#d6d6d6
| 284305 ||  || — || August 15, 2006 || Palomar || NEAT || — || align=right | 3.2 km || 
|-id=306 bgcolor=#d6d6d6
| 284306 ||  || — || August 16, 2006 || Reedy Creek || J. Broughton || EOS || align=right | 2.9 km || 
|-id=307 bgcolor=#d6d6d6
| 284307 ||  || — || August 17, 2006 || Palomar || NEAT || — || align=right | 3.9 km || 
|-id=308 bgcolor=#d6d6d6
| 284308 ||  || — || August 24, 2006 || Pla D'Arguines || R. Ferrando || — || align=right | 3.2 km || 
|-id=309 bgcolor=#FA8072
| 284309 ||  || — || August 25, 2006 || Siding Spring || SSS || H || align=right data-sort-value="0.69" | 690 m || 
|-id=310 bgcolor=#d6d6d6
| 284310 ||  || — || August 22, 2006 || Palomar || NEAT || — || align=right | 3.2 km || 
|-id=311 bgcolor=#d6d6d6
| 284311 ||  || — || August 19, 2006 || Kitt Peak || Spacewatch || — || align=right | 3.2 km || 
|-id=312 bgcolor=#d6d6d6
| 284312 ||  || — || August 19, 2006 || Kitt Peak || Spacewatch || THM || align=right | 3.1 km || 
|-id=313 bgcolor=#d6d6d6
| 284313 ||  || — || August 23, 2006 || Palomar || NEAT || — || align=right | 3.7 km || 
|-id=314 bgcolor=#d6d6d6
| 284314 ||  || — || August 27, 2006 || Kitt Peak || Spacewatch || — || align=right | 3.6 km || 
|-id=315 bgcolor=#d6d6d6
| 284315 ||  || — || August 24, 2006 || Socorro || LINEAR || — || align=right | 4.3 km || 
|-id=316 bgcolor=#d6d6d6
| 284316 ||  || — || August 27, 2006 || Anderson Mesa || LONEOS || — || align=right | 5.2 km || 
|-id=317 bgcolor=#d6d6d6
| 284317 ||  || — || August 29, 2006 || Anderson Mesa || LONEOS || — || align=right | 3.4 km || 
|-id=318 bgcolor=#d6d6d6
| 284318 ||  || — || August 28, 2006 || Anderson Mesa || LONEOS || — || align=right | 3.6 km || 
|-id=319 bgcolor=#d6d6d6
| 284319 ||  || — || August 18, 2006 || Palomar || NEAT || — || align=right | 3.1 km || 
|-id=320 bgcolor=#d6d6d6
| 284320 ||  || — || August 18, 2006 || Palomar || NEAT || — || align=right | 5.8 km || 
|-id=321 bgcolor=#d6d6d6
| 284321 ||  || — || August 19, 2006 || Kitt Peak || Spacewatch || — || align=right | 3.5 km || 
|-id=322 bgcolor=#d6d6d6
| 284322 ||  || — || August 29, 2006 || Anderson Mesa || LONEOS || — || align=right | 4.8 km || 
|-id=323 bgcolor=#d6d6d6
| 284323 ||  || — || August 29, 2006 || Anderson Mesa || LONEOS || — || align=right | 3.9 km || 
|-id=324 bgcolor=#d6d6d6
| 284324 ||  || — || August 29, 2006 || Anderson Mesa || LONEOS || — || align=right | 5.4 km || 
|-id=325 bgcolor=#d6d6d6
| 284325 ||  || — || August 18, 2006 || Palomar || NEAT || — || align=right | 2.8 km || 
|-id=326 bgcolor=#d6d6d6
| 284326 ||  || — || August 27, 2006 || Apache Point || A. C. Becker || — || align=right | 2.3 km || 
|-id=327 bgcolor=#d6d6d6
| 284327 ||  || — || September 13, 2006 || Eskridge || Farpoint Obs. || LIX || align=right | 4.8 km || 
|-id=328 bgcolor=#d6d6d6
| 284328 ||  || — || September 14, 2006 || Kitt Peak || Spacewatch || URS || align=right | 5.4 km || 
|-id=329 bgcolor=#d6d6d6
| 284329 ||  || — || September 14, 2006 || Bergisch Gladbach || W. Bickel || EOS || align=right | 3.4 km || 
|-id=330 bgcolor=#d6d6d6
| 284330 ||  || — || September 14, 2006 || Kitt Peak || Spacewatch || — || align=right | 4.3 km || 
|-id=331 bgcolor=#d6d6d6
| 284331 ||  || — || September 14, 2006 || Kitt Peak || Spacewatch || — || align=right | 4.1 km || 
|-id=332 bgcolor=#d6d6d6
| 284332 ||  || — || September 14, 2006 || Catalina || CSS || — || align=right | 4.5 km || 
|-id=333 bgcolor=#d6d6d6
| 284333 ||  || — || September 14, 2006 || Palomar || NEAT || — || align=right | 3.2 km || 
|-id=334 bgcolor=#fefefe
| 284334 ||  || — || September 14, 2006 || Palomar || NEAT || — || align=right | 1.7 km || 
|-id=335 bgcolor=#fefefe
| 284335 ||  || — || September 14, 2006 || Catalina || CSS || H || align=right data-sort-value="0.66" | 660 m || 
|-id=336 bgcolor=#d6d6d6
| 284336 ||  || — || September 13, 2006 || Palomar || NEAT || — || align=right | 2.9 km || 
|-id=337 bgcolor=#d6d6d6
| 284337 ||  || — || September 14, 2006 || Kitt Peak || Spacewatch || — || align=right | 3.4 km || 
|-id=338 bgcolor=#d6d6d6
| 284338 ||  || — || September 14, 2006 || Kitt Peak || Spacewatch || — || align=right | 3.6 km || 
|-id=339 bgcolor=#d6d6d6
| 284339 ||  || — || September 14, 2006 || Palomar || NEAT || EUP || align=right | 4.8 km || 
|-id=340 bgcolor=#d6d6d6
| 284340 ||  || — || September 14, 2006 || Kitt Peak || Spacewatch || — || align=right | 3.5 km || 
|-id=341 bgcolor=#d6d6d6
| 284341 ||  || — || September 14, 2006 || Kitt Peak || Spacewatch || — || align=right | 3.4 km || 
|-id=342 bgcolor=#d6d6d6
| 284342 ||  || — || September 14, 2006 || Kitt Peak || Spacewatch || — || align=right | 2.8 km || 
|-id=343 bgcolor=#d6d6d6
| 284343 ||  || — || September 15, 2006 || Kitt Peak || Spacewatch || — || align=right | 3.0 km || 
|-id=344 bgcolor=#d6d6d6
| 284344 ||  || — || September 12, 2006 || Catalina || CSS || — || align=right | 3.7 km || 
|-id=345 bgcolor=#d6d6d6
| 284345 ||  || — || September 15, 2006 || Kitt Peak || Spacewatch || — || align=right | 3.0 km || 
|-id=346 bgcolor=#d6d6d6
| 284346 ||  || — || September 15, 2006 || Kitt Peak || Spacewatch || HYG || align=right | 3.3 km || 
|-id=347 bgcolor=#d6d6d6
| 284347 ||  || — || September 15, 2006 || Kitt Peak || Spacewatch || THM || align=right | 2.4 km || 
|-id=348 bgcolor=#d6d6d6
| 284348 ||  || — || September 15, 2006 || Kitt Peak || Spacewatch || THM || align=right | 2.4 km || 
|-id=349 bgcolor=#d6d6d6
| 284349 ||  || — || September 15, 2006 || Kitt Peak || Spacewatch || EOS || align=right | 2.0 km || 
|-id=350 bgcolor=#E9E9E9
| 284350 ||  || — || September 14, 2006 || Palomar || NEAT || — || align=right | 3.4 km || 
|-id=351 bgcolor=#d6d6d6
| 284351 ||  || — || September 14, 2006 || Palomar || NEAT || EOS || align=right | 3.2 km || 
|-id=352 bgcolor=#d6d6d6
| 284352 ||  || — || September 6, 2006 || Palomar || NEAT || — || align=right | 7.3 km || 
|-id=353 bgcolor=#d6d6d6
| 284353 ||  || — || September 18, 2006 || Catalina || CSS || — || align=right | 3.1 km || 
|-id=354 bgcolor=#d6d6d6
| 284354 ||  || — || September 18, 2006 || Catalina || CSS || LIX || align=right | 6.1 km || 
|-id=355 bgcolor=#d6d6d6
| 284355 ||  || — || September 18, 2006 || Kitt Peak || Spacewatch || — || align=right | 3.4 km || 
|-id=356 bgcolor=#d6d6d6
| 284356 ||  || — || September 19, 2006 || Catalina || CSS || — || align=right | 2.7 km || 
|-id=357 bgcolor=#d6d6d6
| 284357 ||  || — || September 23, 2006 || Piszkéstető || K. Sárneczky, Z. Kuli || — || align=right | 3.8 km || 
|-id=358 bgcolor=#d6d6d6
| 284358 ||  || — || September 18, 2006 || Kitt Peak || Spacewatch || THM || align=right | 2.6 km || 
|-id=359 bgcolor=#d6d6d6
| 284359 ||  || — || September 24, 2006 || Anderson Mesa || LONEOS || EUP || align=right | 5.3 km || 
|-id=360 bgcolor=#d6d6d6
| 284360 ||  || — || September 18, 2006 || Catalina || CSS || — || align=right | 3.4 km || 
|-id=361 bgcolor=#d6d6d6
| 284361 ||  || — || September 21, 2006 || Anderson Mesa || LONEOS || — || align=right | 3.7 km || 
|-id=362 bgcolor=#d6d6d6
| 284362 ||  || — || September 17, 2006 || Anderson Mesa || LONEOS || — || align=right | 4.2 km || 
|-id=363 bgcolor=#d6d6d6
| 284363 ||  || — || September 17, 2006 || Catalina || CSS || — || align=right | 3.6 km || 
|-id=364 bgcolor=#d6d6d6
| 284364 ||  || — || September 19, 2006 || Kitt Peak || Spacewatch || THM || align=right | 3.4 km || 
|-id=365 bgcolor=#d6d6d6
| 284365 ||  || — || September 20, 2006 || Catalina || CSS || EOS || align=right | 3.3 km || 
|-id=366 bgcolor=#d6d6d6
| 284366 ||  || — || September 20, 2006 || Palomar || NEAT || — || align=right | 3.8 km || 
|-id=367 bgcolor=#d6d6d6
| 284367 ||  || — || September 25, 2006 || Mount Lemmon || Mount Lemmon Survey || THM || align=right | 2.8 km || 
|-id=368 bgcolor=#d6d6d6
| 284368 ||  || — || September 25, 2006 || Mount Lemmon || Mount Lemmon Survey || THM || align=right | 2.4 km || 
|-id=369 bgcolor=#d6d6d6
| 284369 ||  || — || September 25, 2006 || Kitt Peak || Spacewatch || — || align=right | 3.0 km || 
|-id=370 bgcolor=#d6d6d6
| 284370 ||  || — || September 25, 2006 || Mount Lemmon || Mount Lemmon Survey || — || align=right | 2.9 km || 
|-id=371 bgcolor=#fefefe
| 284371 ||  || — || September 24, 2006 || Kitt Peak || Spacewatch || ERI || align=right | 1.5 km || 
|-id=372 bgcolor=#fefefe
| 284372 ||  || — || September 26, 2006 || Kitt Peak || Spacewatch || H || align=right data-sort-value="0.54" | 540 m || 
|-id=373 bgcolor=#d6d6d6
| 284373 ||  || — || September 26, 2006 || Kitt Peak || Spacewatch || HYG || align=right | 3.3 km || 
|-id=374 bgcolor=#d6d6d6
| 284374 ||  || — || September 26, 2006 || Kitt Peak || Spacewatch || — || align=right | 3.8 km || 
|-id=375 bgcolor=#d6d6d6
| 284375 ||  || — || September 27, 2006 || Mount Lemmon || Mount Lemmon Survey || — || align=right | 3.4 km || 
|-id=376 bgcolor=#d6d6d6
| 284376 ||  || — || September 21, 2006 || Anderson Mesa || LONEOS || — || align=right | 4.3 km || 
|-id=377 bgcolor=#fefefe
| 284377 ||  || — || September 16, 2006 || Catalina || CSS || H || align=right | 1.1 km || 
|-id=378 bgcolor=#d6d6d6
| 284378 ||  || — || September 16, 2006 || Siding Spring || SSS || EUP || align=right | 3.9 km || 
|-id=379 bgcolor=#d6d6d6
| 284379 ||  || — || September 27, 2006 || Kitt Peak || Spacewatch || — || align=right | 3.2 km || 
|-id=380 bgcolor=#d6d6d6
| 284380 ||  || — || September 28, 2006 || Kitt Peak || Spacewatch || VER || align=right | 3.8 km || 
|-id=381 bgcolor=#d6d6d6
| 284381 ||  || — || September 28, 2006 || Kitt Peak || Spacewatch || — || align=right | 3.0 km || 
|-id=382 bgcolor=#d6d6d6
| 284382 ||  || — || September 30, 2006 || Catalina || CSS || HYG || align=right | 3.6 km || 
|-id=383 bgcolor=#fefefe
| 284383 ||  || — || September 30, 2006 || Catalina || CSS || FLO || align=right data-sort-value="0.74" | 740 m || 
|-id=384 bgcolor=#d6d6d6
| 284384 ||  || — || September 27, 2006 || Catalina || CSS || EUP || align=right | 6.6 km || 
|-id=385 bgcolor=#d6d6d6
| 284385 ||  || — || September 17, 2006 || Apache Point || A. C. Becker || — || align=right | 3.0 km || 
|-id=386 bgcolor=#d6d6d6
| 284386 ||  || — || September 17, 2006 || Apache Point || A. C. Becker || — || align=right | 4.5 km || 
|-id=387 bgcolor=#d6d6d6
| 284387 ||  || — || September 28, 2006 || Apache Point || A. C. Becker || — || align=right | 3.7 km || 
|-id=388 bgcolor=#d6d6d6
| 284388 ||  || — || September 30, 2006 || Apache Point || A. C. Becker || — || align=right | 3.3 km || 
|-id=389 bgcolor=#d6d6d6
| 284389 ||  || — || October 11, 2006 || Kitt Peak || Spacewatch || — || align=right | 4.3 km || 
|-id=390 bgcolor=#fefefe
| 284390 ||  || — || October 11, 2006 || Kitt Peak || Spacewatch || — || align=right data-sort-value="0.85" | 850 m || 
|-id=391 bgcolor=#d6d6d6
| 284391 ||  || — || October 11, 2006 || Kitt Peak || Spacewatch || — || align=right | 4.6 km || 
|-id=392 bgcolor=#d6d6d6
| 284392 ||  || — || October 12, 2006 || Kitt Peak || Spacewatch || — || align=right | 3.3 km || 
|-id=393 bgcolor=#d6d6d6
| 284393 ||  || — || October 13, 2006 || Kitt Peak || Spacewatch || VER || align=right | 3.3 km || 
|-id=394 bgcolor=#d6d6d6
| 284394 ||  || — || October 15, 2006 || Catalina || CSS || — || align=right | 3.2 km || 
|-id=395 bgcolor=#d6d6d6
| 284395 ||  || — || October 13, 2006 || Kitt Peak || Spacewatch || — || align=right | 3.2 km || 
|-id=396 bgcolor=#d6d6d6
| 284396 ||  || — || October 11, 2006 || Palomar || NEAT || — || align=right | 3.8 km || 
|-id=397 bgcolor=#d6d6d6
| 284397 ||  || — || October 13, 2006 || Kitt Peak || Spacewatch || LIX || align=right | 5.1 km || 
|-id=398 bgcolor=#d6d6d6
| 284398 ||  || — || October 1, 2006 || Apache Point || A. C. Becker || — || align=right | 3.2 km || 
|-id=399 bgcolor=#fefefe
| 284399 ||  || — || October 16, 2006 || Catalina || CSS || — || align=right data-sort-value="0.85" | 850 m || 
|-id=400 bgcolor=#d6d6d6
| 284400 ||  || — || October 19, 2006 || Catalina || CSS || Tj (2.92) || align=right | 6.0 km || 
|}

284401–284500 

|-bgcolor=#fefefe
| 284401 ||  || — || October 17, 2006 || Catalina || CSS || V || align=right data-sort-value="0.89" | 890 m || 
|-id=402 bgcolor=#d6d6d6
| 284402 ||  || — || October 17, 2006 || Mount Lemmon || Mount Lemmon Survey || EOS || align=right | 2.6 km || 
|-id=403 bgcolor=#d6d6d6
| 284403 ||  || — || October 18, 2006 || Kitt Peak || Spacewatch || — || align=right | 4.9 km || 
|-id=404 bgcolor=#fefefe
| 284404 ||  || — || October 18, 2006 || Kitt Peak || Spacewatch || — || align=right data-sort-value="0.70" | 700 m || 
|-id=405 bgcolor=#d6d6d6
| 284405 ||  || — || October 19, 2006 || Kitt Peak || Spacewatch || HYG || align=right | 3.1 km || 
|-id=406 bgcolor=#d6d6d6
| 284406 ||  || — || October 21, 2006 || Kitt Peak || Spacewatch || — || align=right | 3.4 km || 
|-id=407 bgcolor=#d6d6d6
| 284407 ||  || — || October 21, 2006 || Catalina || CSS || — || align=right | 3.8 km || 
|-id=408 bgcolor=#fefefe
| 284408 ||  || — || October 18, 2006 || Siding Spring || SSS || H || align=right data-sort-value="0.82" | 820 m || 
|-id=409 bgcolor=#d6d6d6
| 284409 ||  || — || October 19, 2006 || Catalina || CSS || — || align=right | 4.0 km || 
|-id=410 bgcolor=#fefefe
| 284410 ||  || — || October 21, 2006 || Kitt Peak || Spacewatch || H || align=right data-sort-value="0.78" | 780 m || 
|-id=411 bgcolor=#d6d6d6
| 284411 ||  || — || October 22, 2006 || Palomar || NEAT || — || align=right | 3.4 km || 
|-id=412 bgcolor=#d6d6d6
| 284412 ||  || — || October 17, 2006 || Catalina || CSS || — || align=right | 3.8 km || 
|-id=413 bgcolor=#d6d6d6
| 284413 ||  || — || October 20, 2006 || Palomar || NEAT || — || align=right | 4.1 km || 
|-id=414 bgcolor=#d6d6d6
| 284414 ||  || — || October 21, 2006 || Palomar || NEAT || HYG || align=right | 3.7 km || 
|-id=415 bgcolor=#d6d6d6
| 284415 ||  || — || October 21, 2006 || Palomar || NEAT || EMA || align=right | 4.0 km || 
|-id=416 bgcolor=#d6d6d6
| 284416 ||  || — || October 19, 2006 || Kitt Peak || M. W. Buie || — || align=right | 2.8 km || 
|-id=417 bgcolor=#fefefe
| 284417 ||  || — || October 31, 2006 || Mount Lemmon || Mount Lemmon Survey || — || align=right data-sort-value="0.73" | 730 m || 
|-id=418 bgcolor=#fefefe
| 284418 ||  || — || November 15, 2006 || Catalina || CSS || H || align=right data-sort-value="0.91" | 910 m || 
|-id=419 bgcolor=#d6d6d6
| 284419 ||  || — || November 20, 2006 || Kitt Peak || Spacewatch || HIL3:2 || align=right | 7.6 km || 
|-id=420 bgcolor=#d6d6d6
| 284420 ||  || — || December 6, 2006 || Palomar || NEAT || — || align=right | 5.3 km || 
|-id=421 bgcolor=#fefefe
| 284421 ||  || — || December 11, 2006 || Kitt Peak || Spacewatch || MAS || align=right data-sort-value="0.86" | 860 m || 
|-id=422 bgcolor=#FFC2E0
| 284422 ||  || — || December 16, 2006 || Catalina || CSS || APO +1kmcritical || align=right | 1.2 km || 
|-id=423 bgcolor=#FA8072
| 284423 ||  || — || January 15, 2007 || Catalina || CSS || — || align=right | 1.5 km || 
|-id=424 bgcolor=#fefefe
| 284424 ||  || — || January 24, 2007 || Socorro || LINEAR || NYS || align=right data-sort-value="0.91" | 910 m || 
|-id=425 bgcolor=#fefefe
| 284425 ||  || — || January 27, 2007 || Kitt Peak || Spacewatch || — || align=right data-sort-value="0.76" | 760 m || 
|-id=426 bgcolor=#fefefe
| 284426 || 2007 CT || — || February 5, 2007 || Lulin Observatory || H.-C. Lin, Q.-z. Ye || NYS || align=right data-sort-value="0.92" | 920 m || 
|-id=427 bgcolor=#fefefe
| 284427 ||  || — || February 6, 2007 || Kitt Peak || Spacewatch || MAS || align=right | 1.0 km || 
|-id=428 bgcolor=#fefefe
| 284428 ||  || — || February 13, 2007 || Mount Lemmon || Mount Lemmon Survey || — || align=right | 1.0 km || 
|-id=429 bgcolor=#fefefe
| 284429 ||  || — || February 16, 2007 || Mount Lemmon || Mount Lemmon Survey || FLO || align=right data-sort-value="0.90" | 900 m || 
|-id=430 bgcolor=#E9E9E9
| 284430 ||  || — || February 17, 2007 || Kitt Peak || Spacewatch || — || align=right data-sort-value="0.95" | 950 m || 
|-id=431 bgcolor=#fefefe
| 284431 ||  || — || February 17, 2007 || Kitt Peak || Spacewatch || FLO || align=right data-sort-value="0.79" | 790 m || 
|-id=432 bgcolor=#fefefe
| 284432 ||  || — || February 17, 2007 || Kitt Peak || Spacewatch || FLO || align=right data-sort-value="0.74" | 740 m || 
|-id=433 bgcolor=#C2FFFF
| 284433 ||  || — || February 19, 2007 || Mount Lemmon || Mount Lemmon Survey || L5 || align=right | 13 km || 
|-id=434 bgcolor=#fefefe
| 284434 ||  || — || February 19, 2007 || Mount Lemmon || Mount Lemmon Survey || — || align=right data-sort-value="0.67" | 670 m || 
|-id=435 bgcolor=#fefefe
| 284435 ||  || — || February 21, 2007 || Kitt Peak || Spacewatch || FLO || align=right data-sort-value="0.78" | 780 m || 
|-id=436 bgcolor=#C2FFFF
| 284436 ||  || — || February 23, 2007 || Mount Lemmon || Mount Lemmon Survey || L5 || align=right | 17 km || 
|-id=437 bgcolor=#E9E9E9
| 284437 ||  || — || February 23, 2007 || Kitt Peak || Spacewatch || — || align=right | 1.1 km || 
|-id=438 bgcolor=#E9E9E9
| 284438 ||  || — || February 21, 2007 || Kitt Peak || Spacewatch || — || align=right | 1.2 km || 
|-id=439 bgcolor=#fefefe
| 284439 ||  || — || February 26, 2007 || Mount Lemmon || Mount Lemmon Survey || NYS || align=right data-sort-value="0.76" | 760 m || 
|-id=440 bgcolor=#fefefe
| 284440 ||  || — || March 9, 2007 || Mount Lemmon || Mount Lemmon Survey || — || align=right data-sort-value="0.83" | 830 m || 
|-id=441 bgcolor=#E9E9E9
| 284441 ||  || — || March 11, 2007 || Mount Lemmon || Mount Lemmon Survey || — || align=right data-sort-value="0.85" | 850 m || 
|-id=442 bgcolor=#C2FFFF
| 284442 ||  || — || March 9, 2007 || Kitt Peak || Spacewatch || L5 || align=right | 11 km || 
|-id=443 bgcolor=#C2FFFF
| 284443 ||  || — || March 10, 2007 || Kitt Peak || Spacewatch || L5 || align=right | 8.9 km || 
|-id=444 bgcolor=#E9E9E9
| 284444 ||  || — || March 11, 2007 || Catalina || CSS || — || align=right data-sort-value="0.91" | 910 m || 
|-id=445 bgcolor=#E9E9E9
| 284445 ||  || — || March 13, 2007 || Catalina || CSS || — || align=right | 1.1 km || 
|-id=446 bgcolor=#E9E9E9
| 284446 ||  || — || March 9, 2007 || Mount Lemmon || Mount Lemmon Survey || — || align=right | 1.1 km || 
|-id=447 bgcolor=#C2FFFF
| 284447 ||  || — || March 12, 2007 || Mount Lemmon || Mount Lemmon Survey || L5 || align=right | 9.6 km || 
|-id=448 bgcolor=#fefefe
| 284448 ||  || — || March 12, 2007 || Mount Lemmon || Mount Lemmon Survey || — || align=right data-sort-value="0.70" | 700 m || 
|-id=449 bgcolor=#fefefe
| 284449 ||  || — || March 13, 2007 || Kitt Peak || Spacewatch || — || align=right data-sort-value="0.81" | 810 m || 
|-id=450 bgcolor=#E9E9E9
| 284450 ||  || — || March 11, 2007 || Mount Lemmon || Mount Lemmon Survey || — || align=right | 2.6 km || 
|-id=451 bgcolor=#fefefe
| 284451 ||  || — || March 11, 2007 || Catalina || CSS || FLO || align=right data-sort-value="0.86" | 860 m || 
|-id=452 bgcolor=#C2FFFF
| 284452 ||  || — || March 11, 2007 || Mount Lemmon || Mount Lemmon Survey || L5 || align=right | 9.5 km || 
|-id=453 bgcolor=#fefefe
| 284453 ||  || — || March 13, 2007 || Mount Lemmon || Mount Lemmon Survey || V || align=right data-sort-value="0.63" | 630 m || 
|-id=454 bgcolor=#C2FFFF
| 284454 ||  || — || March 9, 2007 || Kitt Peak || Spacewatch || L5 || align=right | 12 km || 
|-id=455 bgcolor=#fefefe
| 284455 ||  || — || March 24, 2007 || Marly || P. Kocher || — || align=right | 1.1 km || 
|-id=456 bgcolor=#FA8072
| 284456 ||  || — || March 20, 2007 || Mount Lemmon || Mount Lemmon Survey || — || align=right | 1.2 km || 
|-id=457 bgcolor=#fefefe
| 284457 ||  || — || March 26, 2007 || Kitt Peak || Spacewatch || — || align=right data-sort-value="0.92" | 920 m || 
|-id=458 bgcolor=#fefefe
| 284458 ||  || — || April 8, 2007 || Vallemare di Borbona || V. S. Casulli || — || align=right data-sort-value="0.83" | 830 m || 
|-id=459 bgcolor=#C2FFFF
| 284459 ||  || — || April 11, 2007 || Kitt Peak || Spacewatch || L5 || align=right | 12 km || 
|-id=460 bgcolor=#fefefe
| 284460 ||  || — || April 11, 2007 || Kitt Peak || Spacewatch || NYS || align=right data-sort-value="0.72" | 720 m || 
|-id=461 bgcolor=#E9E9E9
| 284461 ||  || — || April 14, 2007 || Mount Lemmon || Mount Lemmon Survey || — || align=right | 1.5 km || 
|-id=462 bgcolor=#fefefe
| 284462 ||  || — || April 14, 2007 || Kitt Peak || Spacewatch || NYS || align=right data-sort-value="0.70" | 700 m || 
|-id=463 bgcolor=#fefefe
| 284463 ||  || — || April 14, 2007 || Kitt Peak || Spacewatch || MAS || align=right data-sort-value="0.80" | 800 m || 
|-id=464 bgcolor=#E9E9E9
| 284464 ||  || — || April 14, 2007 || Kitt Peak || Spacewatch || — || align=right | 1.3 km || 
|-id=465 bgcolor=#fefefe
| 284465 ||  || — || April 14, 2007 || Mount Lemmon || Mount Lemmon Survey || FLO || align=right data-sort-value="0.72" | 720 m || 
|-id=466 bgcolor=#fefefe
| 284466 ||  || — || April 15, 2007 || Kitt Peak || Spacewatch || — || align=right data-sort-value="0.84" | 840 m || 
|-id=467 bgcolor=#fefefe
| 284467 ||  || — || April 15, 2007 || Kitt Peak || Spacewatch || FLO || align=right data-sort-value="0.57" | 570 m || 
|-id=468 bgcolor=#fefefe
| 284468 ||  || — || April 15, 2007 || Kitt Peak || Spacewatch || NYScritical || align=right data-sort-value="0.63" | 630 m || 
|-id=469 bgcolor=#fefefe
| 284469 ||  || — || April 12, 2007 || Siding Spring || SSS || — || align=right | 1.2 km || 
|-id=470 bgcolor=#E9E9E9
| 284470 ||  || — || April 16, 2007 || Mount Lemmon || Mount Lemmon Survey || — || align=right | 1.4 km || 
|-id=471 bgcolor=#E9E9E9
| 284471 ||  || — || April 18, 2007 || Kitt Peak || Spacewatch || — || align=right | 3.4 km || 
|-id=472 bgcolor=#fefefe
| 284472 ||  || — || April 20, 2007 || Kitt Peak || Spacewatch || — || align=right data-sort-value="0.77" | 770 m || 
|-id=473 bgcolor=#fefefe
| 284473 ||  || — || April 20, 2007 || Kitt Peak || Spacewatch || NYS || align=right data-sort-value="0.76" | 760 m || 
|-id=474 bgcolor=#fefefe
| 284474 ||  || — || April 20, 2007 || Kitt Peak || Spacewatch || — || align=right | 1.1 km || 
|-id=475 bgcolor=#E9E9E9
| 284475 ||  || — || April 22, 2007 || Mount Lemmon || Mount Lemmon Survey || NEM || align=right | 3.0 km || 
|-id=476 bgcolor=#fefefe
| 284476 ||  || — || April 18, 2007 || Mount Lemmon || Mount Lemmon Survey || MAS || align=right data-sort-value="0.82" | 820 m || 
|-id=477 bgcolor=#fefefe
| 284477 ||  || — || April 24, 2007 || Kitt Peak || Spacewatch || — || align=right data-sort-value="0.88" | 880 m || 
|-id=478 bgcolor=#fefefe
| 284478 ||  || — || April 19, 2007 || Socorro || LINEAR || NYS || align=right data-sort-value="0.98" | 980 m || 
|-id=479 bgcolor=#fefefe
| 284479 ||  || — || April 20, 2007 || Kitt Peak || Spacewatch || — || align=right data-sort-value="0.87" | 870 m || 
|-id=480 bgcolor=#fefefe
| 284480 ||  || — || May 7, 2007 || Catalina || CSS || NYS || align=right data-sort-value="0.86" | 860 m || 
|-id=481 bgcolor=#fefefe
| 284481 ||  || — || May 6, 2007 || Purple Mountain || PMO NEO || — || align=right | 1.1 km || 
|-id=482 bgcolor=#fefefe
| 284482 ||  || — || May 11, 2007 || Mount Lemmon || Mount Lemmon Survey || NYS || align=right data-sort-value="0.76" | 760 m || 
|-id=483 bgcolor=#fefefe
| 284483 ||  || — || May 11, 2007 || Tiki || S. F. Hönig, N. Teamo || V || align=right data-sort-value="0.78" | 780 m || 
|-id=484 bgcolor=#d6d6d6
| 284484 ||  || — || May 9, 2007 || Kitt Peak || Spacewatch || CHA || align=right | 2.6 km || 
|-id=485 bgcolor=#fefefe
| 284485 ||  || — || May 12, 2007 || Purple Mountain || PMO NEO || V || align=right | 1.0 km || 
|-id=486 bgcolor=#fefefe
| 284486 ||  || — || June 10, 2007 || Kitt Peak || Spacewatch || NYS || align=right data-sort-value="0.72" | 720 m || 
|-id=487 bgcolor=#fefefe
| 284487 ||  || — || June 14, 2007 || Kitt Peak || Spacewatch || — || align=right | 2.4 km || 
|-id=488 bgcolor=#E9E9E9
| 284488 ||  || — || June 20, 2007 || Kitt Peak || Spacewatch || — || align=right | 1.5 km || 
|-id=489 bgcolor=#E9E9E9
| 284489 ||  || — || June 21, 2007 || Kitt Peak || Spacewatch || — || align=right data-sort-value="0.96" | 960 m || 
|-id=490 bgcolor=#E9E9E9
| 284490 || 2007 NZ || — || July 11, 2007 || La Sagra || OAM Obs. || — || align=right | 1.0 km || 
|-id=491 bgcolor=#E9E9E9
| 284491 ||  || — || July 13, 2007 || La Sagra || OAM Obs. || — || align=right | 1.5 km || 
|-id=492 bgcolor=#fefefe
| 284492 ||  || — || July 11, 2007 || Lulin Observatory || LUSS || — || align=right | 1.4 km || 
|-id=493 bgcolor=#fefefe
| 284493 ||  || — || July 10, 2007 || Siding Spring || SSS || — || align=right | 3.1 km || 
|-id=494 bgcolor=#fefefe
| 284494 ||  || — || July 16, 2007 || Socorro || LINEAR || LCI || align=right | 1.7 km || 
|-id=495 bgcolor=#E9E9E9
| 284495 ||  || — || July 19, 2007 || Tiki || S. F. Hönig, N. Teamo || — || align=right | 1.4 km || 
|-id=496 bgcolor=#fefefe
| 284496 ||  || — || August 5, 2007 || Socorro || LINEAR || — || align=right | 1.4 km || 
|-id=497 bgcolor=#E9E9E9
| 284497 ||  || — || August 5, 2007 || Dauban || Chante-Perdrix Obs. || — || align=right | 1.1 km || 
|-id=498 bgcolor=#E9E9E9
| 284498 ||  || — || August 11, 2007 || Bisei SG Center || BATTeRS || — || align=right | 1.8 km || 
|-id=499 bgcolor=#E9E9E9
| 284499 ||  || — || August 8, 2007 || Socorro || LINEAR || — || align=right | 1.3 km || 
|-id=500 bgcolor=#E9E9E9
| 284500 ||  || — || August 8, 2007 || Socorro || LINEAR || — || align=right | 1.1 km || 
|}

284501–284600 

|-bgcolor=#E9E9E9
| 284501 ||  || — || August 9, 2007 || Socorro || LINEAR || — || align=right | 1.1 km || 
|-id=502 bgcolor=#E9E9E9
| 284502 ||  || — || August 12, 2007 || Socorro || LINEAR || — || align=right | 2.8 km || 
|-id=503 bgcolor=#fefefe
| 284503 ||  || — || August 11, 2007 || Socorro || LINEAR || NYS || align=right data-sort-value="0.93" | 930 m || 
|-id=504 bgcolor=#fefefe
| 284504 ||  || — || August 12, 2007 || Socorro || LINEAR || V || align=right | 1.2 km || 
|-id=505 bgcolor=#fefefe
| 284505 ||  || — || August 9, 2007 || Socorro || LINEAR || — || align=right | 1.4 km || 
|-id=506 bgcolor=#E9E9E9
| 284506 ||  || — || August 11, 2007 || Socorro || LINEAR || — || align=right | 1.3 km || 
|-id=507 bgcolor=#E9E9E9
| 284507 ||  || — || August 13, 2007 || Socorro || LINEAR || — || align=right | 1.7 km || 
|-id=508 bgcolor=#E9E9E9
| 284508 ||  || — || August 15, 2007 || Socorro || LINEAR || — || align=right | 1.0 km || 
|-id=509 bgcolor=#E9E9E9
| 284509 ||  || — || August 21, 2007 || Siding Spring || SSS || — || align=right | 2.1 km || 
|-id=510 bgcolor=#E9E9E9
| 284510 ||  || — || September 12, 2007 || Hibiscus || S. F. Hönig, N. Teamo || — || align=right | 1.8 km || 
|-id=511 bgcolor=#fefefe
| 284511 ||  || — || September 3, 2007 || Catalina || CSS || MAS || align=right | 1.1 km || 
|-id=512 bgcolor=#E9E9E9
| 284512 ||  || — || September 8, 2007 || Anderson Mesa || LONEOS || — || align=right | 3.9 km || 
|-id=513 bgcolor=#E9E9E9
| 284513 ||  || — || September 8, 2007 || Anderson Mesa || LONEOS || — || align=right | 3.5 km || 
|-id=514 bgcolor=#d6d6d6
| 284514 ||  || — || September 8, 2007 || Anderson Mesa || LONEOS || — || align=right | 3.5 km || 
|-id=515 bgcolor=#E9E9E9
| 284515 ||  || — || September 9, 2007 || Kitt Peak || Spacewatch || — || align=right | 1.6 km || 
|-id=516 bgcolor=#E9E9E9
| 284516 ||  || — || September 9, 2007 || Mount Lemmon || Mount Lemmon Survey || AGN || align=right | 1.4 km || 
|-id=517 bgcolor=#E9E9E9
| 284517 ||  || — || September 10, 2007 || Mount Lemmon || Mount Lemmon Survey || — || align=right | 1.2 km || 
|-id=518 bgcolor=#E9E9E9
| 284518 ||  || — || September 10, 2007 || Mount Lemmon || Mount Lemmon Survey || HEN || align=right | 1.3 km || 
|-id=519 bgcolor=#E9E9E9
| 284519 ||  || — || September 10, 2007 || Mount Lemmon || Mount Lemmon Survey || — || align=right | 3.0 km || 
|-id=520 bgcolor=#d6d6d6
| 284520 ||  || — || September 10, 2007 || Kitt Peak || Spacewatch || KOR || align=right | 2.0 km || 
|-id=521 bgcolor=#E9E9E9
| 284521 ||  || — || September 10, 2007 || Kitt Peak || Spacewatch || — || align=right | 2.5 km || 
|-id=522 bgcolor=#E9E9E9
| 284522 ||  || — || September 10, 2007 || Kitt Peak || Spacewatch || — || align=right | 1.3 km || 
|-id=523 bgcolor=#E9E9E9
| 284523 ||  || — || September 11, 2007 || Catalina || CSS || JUN || align=right | 1.2 km || 
|-id=524 bgcolor=#E9E9E9
| 284524 ||  || — || September 11, 2007 || Črni Vrh || Črni Vrh || — || align=right | 3.4 km || 
|-id=525 bgcolor=#E9E9E9
| 284525 ||  || — || September 12, 2007 || Mount Lemmon || Mount Lemmon Survey || — || align=right | 1.6 km || 
|-id=526 bgcolor=#E9E9E9
| 284526 ||  || — || September 13, 2007 || Mount Lemmon || Mount Lemmon Survey || — || align=right | 3.4 km || 
|-id=527 bgcolor=#E9E9E9
| 284527 ||  || — || September 14, 2007 || Anderson Mesa || LONEOS || — || align=right | 1.7 km || 
|-id=528 bgcolor=#E9E9E9
| 284528 ||  || — || September 15, 2007 || Lulin || LUSS || — || align=right | 1.7 km || 
|-id=529 bgcolor=#E9E9E9
| 284529 ||  || — || September 7, 2007 || Socorro || LINEAR || IAN || align=right | 1.1 km || 
|-id=530 bgcolor=#E9E9E9
| 284530 ||  || — || September 14, 2007 || Socorro || LINEAR || — || align=right | 2.7 km || 
|-id=531 bgcolor=#E9E9E9
| 284531 ||  || — || September 11, 2007 || Purple Mountain || PMO NEO || — || align=right | 1.2 km || 
|-id=532 bgcolor=#E9E9E9
| 284532 ||  || — || September 11, 2007 || Purple Mountain || PMO NEO || — || align=right | 2.8 km || 
|-id=533 bgcolor=#E9E9E9
| 284533 ||  || — || September 10, 2007 || Kitt Peak || Spacewatch || — || align=right | 1.8 km || 
|-id=534 bgcolor=#E9E9E9
| 284534 ||  || — || September 10, 2007 || Kitt Peak || Spacewatch || — || align=right | 2.2 km || 
|-id=535 bgcolor=#E9E9E9
| 284535 ||  || — || September 10, 2007 || Kitt Peak || Spacewatch || — || align=right | 2.2 km || 
|-id=536 bgcolor=#E9E9E9
| 284536 ||  || — || September 10, 2007 || Kitt Peak || Spacewatch || MRX || align=right | 1.5 km || 
|-id=537 bgcolor=#E9E9E9
| 284537 ||  || — || September 13, 2007 || Kitt Peak || Spacewatch || HOF || align=right | 3.1 km || 
|-id=538 bgcolor=#E9E9E9
| 284538 ||  || — || September 9, 2007 || Kitt Peak || Spacewatch || — || align=right | 2.3 km || 
|-id=539 bgcolor=#E9E9E9
| 284539 ||  || — || September 9, 2007 || Kitt Peak || Spacewatch || — || align=right | 1.1 km || 
|-id=540 bgcolor=#E9E9E9
| 284540 ||  || — || September 13, 2007 || Mount Lemmon || Mount Lemmon Survey || — || align=right | 1.5 km || 
|-id=541 bgcolor=#d6d6d6
| 284541 ||  || — || September 13, 2007 || Mount Lemmon || Mount Lemmon Survey || KOR || align=right | 1.8 km || 
|-id=542 bgcolor=#E9E9E9
| 284542 ||  || — || September 15, 2007 || Socorro || LINEAR || — || align=right | 2.4 km || 
|-id=543 bgcolor=#E9E9E9
| 284543 ||  || — || September 13, 2007 || Kitt Peak || Spacewatch || — || align=right | 3.4 km || 
|-id=544 bgcolor=#E9E9E9
| 284544 ||  || — || September 13, 2007 || Kitt Peak || Spacewatch || — || align=right | 2.4 km || 
|-id=545 bgcolor=#d6d6d6
| 284545 ||  || — || September 15, 2007 || Kitt Peak || Spacewatch || — || align=right | 2.4 km || 
|-id=546 bgcolor=#E9E9E9
| 284546 ||  || — || September 5, 2007 || Catalina || CSS || — || align=right | 2.3 km || 
|-id=547 bgcolor=#E9E9E9
| 284547 ||  || — || September 5, 2007 || Catalina || CSS || — || align=right | 2.5 km || 
|-id=548 bgcolor=#E9E9E9
| 284548 ||  || — || September 6, 2007 || Siding Spring || SSS || — || align=right | 1.8 km || 
|-id=549 bgcolor=#E9E9E9
| 284549 ||  || — || September 11, 2007 || Mount Lemmon || Mount Lemmon Survey || — || align=right | 1.8 km || 
|-id=550 bgcolor=#E9E9E9
| 284550 ||  || — || September 13, 2007 || Mount Lemmon || Mount Lemmon Survey || HOF || align=right | 2.4 km || 
|-id=551 bgcolor=#E9E9E9
| 284551 ||  || — || September 13, 2007 || Mount Lemmon || Mount Lemmon Survey || — || align=right | 1.9 km || 
|-id=552 bgcolor=#E9E9E9
| 284552 ||  || — || September 10, 2007 || Kitt Peak || Spacewatch || — || align=right | 1.8 km || 
|-id=553 bgcolor=#d6d6d6
| 284553 ||  || — || September 12, 2007 || Catalina || CSS || 7:4 || align=right | 5.9 km || 
|-id=554 bgcolor=#d6d6d6
| 284554 ||  || — || September 15, 2007 || Mount Lemmon || Mount Lemmon Survey || — || align=right | 3.7 km || 
|-id=555 bgcolor=#E9E9E9
| 284555 ||  || — || September 18, 2007 || Kitt Peak || Spacewatch || MRX || align=right | 1.5 km || 
|-id=556 bgcolor=#E9E9E9
| 284556 ||  || — || September 22, 2007 || Sandlot || G. Hug || — || align=right | 1.7 km || 
|-id=557 bgcolor=#E9E9E9
| 284557 ||  || — || September 19, 2007 || Kitt Peak || Spacewatch || — || align=right | 1.6 km || 
|-id=558 bgcolor=#E9E9E9
| 284558 ||  || — || September 21, 2007 || Socorro || LINEAR || — || align=right | 3.3 km || 
|-id=559 bgcolor=#d6d6d6
| 284559 ||  || — || October 5, 2007 || Prairie Grass || J. Mahony || — || align=right | 2.4 km || 
|-id=560 bgcolor=#d6d6d6
| 284560 ||  || — || October 6, 2007 || Dauban || Chante-Perdrix Obs. || EOS || align=right | 3.2 km || 
|-id=561 bgcolor=#E9E9E9
| 284561 ||  || — || October 4, 2007 || Kitt Peak || Spacewatch || — || align=right | 3.2 km || 
|-id=562 bgcolor=#E9E9E9
| 284562 ||  || — || October 6, 2007 || Kitt Peak || Spacewatch || — || align=right | 1.3 km || 
|-id=563 bgcolor=#E9E9E9
| 284563 ||  || — || October 7, 2007 || Catalina || CSS || — || align=right | 1.9 km || 
|-id=564 bgcolor=#E9E9E9
| 284564 ||  || — || October 7, 2007 || Catalina || CSS || — || align=right | 2.7 km || 
|-id=565 bgcolor=#E9E9E9
| 284565 ||  || — || October 4, 2007 || Kitt Peak || Spacewatch || HOF || align=right | 3.2 km || 
|-id=566 bgcolor=#d6d6d6
| 284566 ||  || — || October 4, 2007 || Kitt Peak || Spacewatch || — || align=right | 2.5 km || 
|-id=567 bgcolor=#d6d6d6
| 284567 ||  || — || October 4, 2007 || Kitt Peak || Spacewatch || KOR || align=right | 1.7 km || 
|-id=568 bgcolor=#E9E9E9
| 284568 ||  || — || October 4, 2007 || Kitt Peak || Spacewatch || — || align=right | 3.9 km || 
|-id=569 bgcolor=#d6d6d6
| 284569 ||  || — || October 4, 2007 || Kitt Peak || Spacewatch || CHA || align=right | 3.0 km || 
|-id=570 bgcolor=#d6d6d6
| 284570 ||  || — || October 4, 2007 || Kitt Peak || Spacewatch || KOR || align=right | 1.7 km || 
|-id=571 bgcolor=#d6d6d6
| 284571 ||  || — || October 4, 2007 || Kitt Peak || Spacewatch || — || align=right | 2.4 km || 
|-id=572 bgcolor=#d6d6d6
| 284572 ||  || — || October 4, 2007 || Kitt Peak || Spacewatch || — || align=right | 3.7 km || 
|-id=573 bgcolor=#E9E9E9
| 284573 ||  || — || October 6, 2007 || Kitt Peak || Spacewatch || — || align=right | 2.7 km || 
|-id=574 bgcolor=#E9E9E9
| 284574 ||  || — || October 7, 2007 || Catalina || CSS || — || align=right | 1.9 km || 
|-id=575 bgcolor=#E9E9E9
| 284575 ||  || — || October 13, 2007 || Kitami || K. Endate || EUN || align=right | 1.7 km || 
|-id=576 bgcolor=#E9E9E9
| 284576 ||  || — || October 4, 2007 || Purple Mountain || PMO NEO || — || align=right | 1.9 km || 
|-id=577 bgcolor=#E9E9E9
| 284577 ||  || — || October 7, 2007 || Catalina || CSS || NEM || align=right | 3.0 km || 
|-id=578 bgcolor=#d6d6d6
| 284578 ||  || — || October 8, 2007 || Mount Lemmon || Mount Lemmon Survey || KOR || align=right | 1.5 km || 
|-id=579 bgcolor=#d6d6d6
| 284579 ||  || — || October 8, 2007 || Mount Lemmon || Mount Lemmon Survey || HYG || align=right | 3.7 km || 
|-id=580 bgcolor=#d6d6d6
| 284580 ||  || — || October 8, 2007 || Mount Lemmon || Mount Lemmon Survey || KOR || align=right | 1.6 km || 
|-id=581 bgcolor=#E9E9E9
| 284581 ||  || — || October 7, 2007 || Mount Lemmon || Mount Lemmon Survey || XIZ || align=right | 1.4 km || 
|-id=582 bgcolor=#E9E9E9
| 284582 ||  || — || October 9, 2007 || Catalina || CSS || — || align=right | 2.7 km || 
|-id=583 bgcolor=#E9E9E9
| 284583 ||  || — || October 7, 2007 || Socorro || LINEAR || — || align=right | 2.1 km || 
|-id=584 bgcolor=#E9E9E9
| 284584 ||  || — || October 9, 2007 || Socorro || LINEAR || NEM || align=right | 2.8 km || 
|-id=585 bgcolor=#d6d6d6
| 284585 ||  || — || October 6, 2007 || Kitt Peak || Spacewatch || CHA || align=right | 2.2 km || 
|-id=586 bgcolor=#E9E9E9
| 284586 ||  || — || October 8, 2007 || Anderson Mesa || LONEOS || — || align=right | 2.6 km || 
|-id=587 bgcolor=#E9E9E9
| 284587 ||  || — || October 13, 2007 || Socorro || LINEAR || — || align=right | 2.8 km || 
|-id=588 bgcolor=#E9E9E9
| 284588 ||  || — || October 6, 2007 || Kitt Peak || Spacewatch || — || align=right | 1.9 km || 
|-id=589 bgcolor=#d6d6d6
| 284589 ||  || — || October 6, 2007 || Kitt Peak || Spacewatch || — || align=right | 3.7 km || 
|-id=590 bgcolor=#d6d6d6
| 284590 ||  || — || October 7, 2007 || Mount Lemmon || Mount Lemmon Survey || KOR || align=right | 1.5 km || 
|-id=591 bgcolor=#E9E9E9
| 284591 ||  || — || October 8, 2007 || Kitt Peak || Spacewatch || — || align=right | 2.6 km || 
|-id=592 bgcolor=#E9E9E9
| 284592 ||  || — || October 7, 2007 || Kitt Peak || Spacewatch || — || align=right | 1.9 km || 
|-id=593 bgcolor=#E9E9E9
| 284593 ||  || — || October 7, 2007 || Mount Lemmon || Mount Lemmon Survey || — || align=right | 2.7 km || 
|-id=594 bgcolor=#E9E9E9
| 284594 ||  || — || October 10, 2007 || Mount Lemmon || Mount Lemmon Survey || — || align=right | 2.4 km || 
|-id=595 bgcolor=#E9E9E9
| 284595 ||  || — || October 8, 2007 || Mount Lemmon || Mount Lemmon Survey || — || align=right | 2.3 km || 
|-id=596 bgcolor=#E9E9E9
| 284596 ||  || — || October 8, 2007 || Catalina || CSS || — || align=right | 2.7 km || 
|-id=597 bgcolor=#E9E9E9
| 284597 ||  || — || October 10, 2007 || Mount Lemmon || Mount Lemmon Survey || AGN || align=right | 1.5 km || 
|-id=598 bgcolor=#E9E9E9
| 284598 ||  || — || October 13, 2007 || Anderson Mesa || LONEOS || — || align=right | 3.8 km || 
|-id=599 bgcolor=#d6d6d6
| 284599 ||  || — || October 14, 2007 || Kitt Peak || Spacewatch || EOS || align=right | 2.6 km || 
|-id=600 bgcolor=#d6d6d6
| 284600 ||  || — || October 15, 2007 || Catalina || CSS || NAE || align=right | 3.1 km || 
|}

284601–284700 

|-bgcolor=#d6d6d6
| 284601 ||  || — || October 4, 2007 || Kitt Peak || Spacewatch || KOR || align=right | 1.7 km || 
|-id=602 bgcolor=#d6d6d6
| 284602 ||  || — || October 4, 2007 || Kitt Peak || Spacewatch || KOR || align=right | 1.3 km || 
|-id=603 bgcolor=#E9E9E9
| 284603 ||  || — || October 4, 2007 || Kitt Peak || Spacewatch || — || align=right | 2.7 km || 
|-id=604 bgcolor=#E9E9E9
| 284604 ||  || — || October 4, 2007 || Kitt Peak || Spacewatch || AGN || align=right | 1.4 km || 
|-id=605 bgcolor=#d6d6d6
| 284605 ||  || — || October 9, 2007 || Kitt Peak || Spacewatch || — || align=right | 4.1 km || 
|-id=606 bgcolor=#E9E9E9
| 284606 ||  || — || October 10, 2007 || Catalina || CSS || — || align=right | 3.5 km || 
|-id=607 bgcolor=#d6d6d6
| 284607 ||  || — || October 12, 2007 || Kitt Peak || Spacewatch || KOR || align=right | 1.5 km || 
|-id=608 bgcolor=#E9E9E9
| 284608 ||  || — || October 13, 2007 || Catalina || CSS || WIT || align=right | 1.4 km || 
|-id=609 bgcolor=#E9E9E9
| 284609 ||  || — || October 7, 2007 || Catalina || CSS || MRX || align=right | 1.1 km || 
|-id=610 bgcolor=#d6d6d6
| 284610 ||  || — || October 10, 2007 || Catalina || CSS || — || align=right | 4.0 km || 
|-id=611 bgcolor=#E9E9E9
| 284611 ||  || — || October 16, 2007 || Purple Mountain || PMO NEO || GAL || align=right | 2.6 km || 
|-id=612 bgcolor=#E9E9E9
| 284612 ||  || — || October 18, 2007 || Mount Lemmon || Mount Lemmon Survey || HEN || align=right | 1.2 km || 
|-id=613 bgcolor=#d6d6d6
| 284613 ||  || — || October 30, 2007 || Mount Lemmon || Mount Lemmon Survey || KOR || align=right | 1.6 km || 
|-id=614 bgcolor=#E9E9E9
| 284614 ||  || — || October 30, 2007 || Catalina || CSS || — || align=right | 2.3 km || 
|-id=615 bgcolor=#d6d6d6
| 284615 ||  || — || October 20, 2007 || Kitt Peak || Spacewatch || KOR || align=right | 1.6 km || 
|-id=616 bgcolor=#d6d6d6
| 284616 ||  || — || October 31, 2007 || Mount Lemmon || Mount Lemmon Survey || KOR || align=right | 1.4 km || 
|-id=617 bgcolor=#d6d6d6
| 284617 ||  || — || October 30, 2007 || Kitt Peak || Spacewatch || — || align=right | 3.0 km || 
|-id=618 bgcolor=#d6d6d6
| 284618 ||  || — || October 30, 2007 || Kitt Peak || Spacewatch || — || align=right | 2.9 km || 
|-id=619 bgcolor=#E9E9E9
| 284619 ||  || — || October 31, 2007 || Catalina || CSS || — || align=right | 2.5 km || 
|-id=620 bgcolor=#d6d6d6
| 284620 ||  || — || October 20, 2007 || Mount Lemmon || Mount Lemmon Survey || — || align=right | 2.8 km || 
|-id=621 bgcolor=#d6d6d6
| 284621 ||  || — || October 20, 2007 || Mount Lemmon || Mount Lemmon Survey || — || align=right | 2.7 km || 
|-id=622 bgcolor=#d6d6d6
| 284622 ||  || — || November 1, 2007 || Kitt Peak || Spacewatch || NAE || align=right | 3.4 km || 
|-id=623 bgcolor=#E9E9E9
| 284623 ||  || — || November 1, 2007 || Kitt Peak || Spacewatch || — || align=right | 1.8 km || 
|-id=624 bgcolor=#E9E9E9
| 284624 ||  || — || November 2, 2007 || Socorro || LINEAR || — || align=right | 3.8 km || 
|-id=625 bgcolor=#d6d6d6
| 284625 ||  || — || November 3, 2007 || Kitt Peak || Spacewatch || — || align=right | 2.8 km || 
|-id=626 bgcolor=#E9E9E9
| 284626 ||  || — || November 4, 2007 || Kitt Peak || Spacewatch || PAD || align=right | 1.8 km || 
|-id=627 bgcolor=#d6d6d6
| 284627 ||  || — || November 5, 2007 || Kitt Peak || Spacewatch || — || align=right | 4.5 km || 
|-id=628 bgcolor=#E9E9E9
| 284628 ||  || — || November 5, 2007 || Mount Lemmon || Mount Lemmon Survey || HOF || align=right | 2.5 km || 
|-id=629 bgcolor=#E9E9E9
| 284629 ||  || — || November 7, 2007 || Catalina || CSS || — || align=right | 2.7 km || 
|-id=630 bgcolor=#E9E9E9
| 284630 ||  || — || November 11, 2007 || Bisei SG Center || BATTeRS || — || align=right | 2.7 km || 
|-id=631 bgcolor=#d6d6d6
| 284631 ||  || — || November 9, 2007 || Kitt Peak || Spacewatch || — || align=right | 2.6 km || 
|-id=632 bgcolor=#d6d6d6
| 284632 ||  || — || November 12, 2007 || Catalina || CSS || HYG || align=right | 4.2 km || 
|-id=633 bgcolor=#d6d6d6
| 284633 ||  || — || November 13, 2007 || Catalina || CSS || HYG || align=right | 3.5 km || 
|-id=634 bgcolor=#d6d6d6
| 284634 ||  || — || November 13, 2007 || Calvin-Rehoboth || Calvin–Rehoboth Obs. || HIL3:2 || align=right | 6.9 km || 
|-id=635 bgcolor=#E9E9E9
| 284635 ||  || — || November 11, 2007 || Socorro || LINEAR || — || align=right | 3.3 km || 
|-id=636 bgcolor=#d6d6d6
| 284636 ||  || — || November 14, 2007 || Kitt Peak || Spacewatch || EUP || align=right | 5.2 km || 
|-id=637 bgcolor=#E9E9E9
| 284637 ||  || — || November 3, 2007 || Catalina || CSS || — || align=right | 2.2 km || 
|-id=638 bgcolor=#d6d6d6
| 284638 ||  || — || November 5, 2007 || Kitt Peak || Spacewatch || — || align=right | 5.9 km || 
|-id=639 bgcolor=#d6d6d6
| 284639 ||  || — || November 2, 2007 || Socorro || LINEAR || — || align=right | 7.4 km || 
|-id=640 bgcolor=#d6d6d6
| 284640 ||  || — || November 3, 2007 || Socorro || LINEAR || — || align=right | 4.1 km || 
|-id=641 bgcolor=#d6d6d6
| 284641 ||  || — || November 2, 2007 || Kitt Peak || Spacewatch || EOS || align=right | 2.2 km || 
|-id=642 bgcolor=#d6d6d6
| 284642 ||  || — || November 2, 2007 || Socorro || LINEAR || EOS || align=right | 2.8 km || 
|-id=643 bgcolor=#d6d6d6
| 284643 ||  || — || November 3, 2007 || Mount Lemmon || Mount Lemmon Survey || — || align=right | 3.1 km || 
|-id=644 bgcolor=#d6d6d6
| 284644 ||  || — || November 12, 2007 || Socorro || LINEAR || — || align=right | 4.5 km || 
|-id=645 bgcolor=#d6d6d6
| 284645 ||  || — || November 14, 2007 || Socorro || LINEAR || — || align=right | 3.7 km || 
|-id=646 bgcolor=#E9E9E9
| 284646 ||  || — || November 16, 2007 || Mount Lemmon || Mount Lemmon Survey || — || align=right | 2.5 km || 
|-id=647 bgcolor=#d6d6d6
| 284647 ||  || — || November 18, 2007 || Mount Lemmon || Mount Lemmon Survey || EOS || align=right | 3.2 km || 
|-id=648 bgcolor=#E9E9E9
| 284648 ||  || — || November 20, 2007 || Kitt Peak || Spacewatch || — || align=right | 2.4 km || 
|-id=649 bgcolor=#E9E9E9
| 284649 ||  || — || August 14, 2002 || Palomar || NEAT || — || align=right | 3.6 km || 
|-id=650 bgcolor=#d6d6d6
| 284650 ||  || — || December 3, 2007 || Catalina || CSS || — || align=right | 5.1 km || 
|-id=651 bgcolor=#d6d6d6
| 284651 ||  || — || December 4, 2007 || Catalina || CSS || — || align=right | 3.7 km || 
|-id=652 bgcolor=#d6d6d6
| 284652 ||  || — || December 14, 2007 || Purple Mountain || PMO NEO || URS || align=right | 5.9 km || 
|-id=653 bgcolor=#E9E9E9
| 284653 ||  || — || December 16, 2007 || Kitt Peak || Spacewatch || — || align=right | 2.5 km || 
|-id=654 bgcolor=#d6d6d6
| 284654 ||  || — || December 30, 2007 || Catalina || CSS || — || align=right | 6.2 km || 
|-id=655 bgcolor=#d6d6d6
| 284655 ||  || — || December 30, 2007 || Mallorca || OAM Obs. || — || align=right | 4.6 km || 
|-id=656 bgcolor=#d6d6d6
| 284656 ||  || — || January 10, 2008 || Catalina || CSS || — || align=right | 3.2 km || 
|-id=657 bgcolor=#d6d6d6
| 284657 ||  || — || January 12, 2008 || Bisei SG Center || BATTeRS || EUP || align=right | 5.8 km || 
|-id=658 bgcolor=#d6d6d6
| 284658 ||  || — || January 15, 2008 || Kitt Peak || Spacewatch || — || align=right | 5.3 km || 
|-id=659 bgcolor=#d6d6d6
| 284659 ||  || — || January 16, 2008 || Kitt Peak || Spacewatch || — || align=right | 3.9 km || 
|-id=660 bgcolor=#d6d6d6
| 284660 ||  || — || January 30, 2008 || Catalina || CSS || EUP || align=right | 4.7 km || 
|-id=661 bgcolor=#d6d6d6
| 284661 ||  || — || February 6, 2008 || Catalina || CSS || EOS || align=right | 3.5 km || 
|-id=662 bgcolor=#d6d6d6
| 284662 ||  || — || February 2, 2008 || Kitt Peak || Spacewatch || 7:4 || align=right | 3.7 km || 
|-id=663 bgcolor=#C2FFFF
| 284663 ||  || — || March 27, 2008 || Kitt Peak || Spacewatch || L5 || align=right | 10 km || 
|-id=664 bgcolor=#C2FFFF
| 284664 ||  || — || March 30, 2008 || Kitt Peak || Spacewatch || L5 || align=right | 10 km || 
|-id=665 bgcolor=#C2FFFF
| 284665 ||  || — || March 30, 2008 || Kitt Peak || Spacewatch || L5 || align=right | 10 km || 
|-id=666 bgcolor=#C2FFFF
| 284666 ||  || — || April 4, 2008 || Kitt Peak || Spacewatch || L5 || align=right | 14 km || 
|-id=667 bgcolor=#C2FFFF
| 284667 ||  || — || April 7, 2008 || Kitt Peak || Spacewatch || L5 || align=right | 10 km || 
|-id=668 bgcolor=#E9E9E9
| 284668 ||  || — || May 7, 2008 || Kitt Peak || Spacewatch || — || align=right | 1.8 km || 
|-id=669 bgcolor=#E9E9E9
| 284669 ||  || — || July 31, 2008 || La Sagra || OAM Obs. || AGN || align=right | 1.6 km || 
|-id=670 bgcolor=#fefefe
| 284670 ||  || — || August 22, 2008 || Kitt Peak || Spacewatch || FLO || align=right data-sort-value="0.78" | 780 m || 
|-id=671 bgcolor=#fefefe
| 284671 ||  || — || August 21, 2008 || Kitt Peak || Spacewatch || — || align=right data-sort-value="0.57" | 570 m || 
|-id=672 bgcolor=#d6d6d6
| 284672 ||  || — || August 27, 2008 || La Sagra || OAM Obs. || EOS || align=right | 3.0 km || 
|-id=673 bgcolor=#E9E9E9
| 284673 ||  || — || September 3, 2008 || Kitt Peak || Spacewatch || — || align=right | 1.3 km || 
|-id=674 bgcolor=#fefefe
| 284674 ||  || — || September 2, 2008 || Kitt Peak || Spacewatch || — || align=right data-sort-value="0.90" | 900 m || 
|-id=675 bgcolor=#fefefe
| 284675 ||  || — || September 5, 2008 || Kitt Peak || Spacewatch || — || align=right data-sort-value="0.86" | 860 m || 
|-id=676 bgcolor=#fefefe
| 284676 ||  || — || September 5, 2008 || Kitt Peak || Spacewatch || — || align=right data-sort-value="0.81" | 810 m || 
|-id=677 bgcolor=#fefefe
| 284677 ||  || — || September 7, 2008 || Catalina || CSS || — || align=right data-sort-value="0.76" | 760 m || 
|-id=678 bgcolor=#E9E9E9
| 284678 ||  || — || September 7, 2008 || Mount Lemmon || Mount Lemmon Survey || — || align=right | 1.7 km || 
|-id=679 bgcolor=#fefefe
| 284679 ||  || — || September 4, 2008 || Kitt Peak || Spacewatch || FLO || align=right data-sort-value="0.67" | 670 m || 
|-id=680 bgcolor=#fefefe
| 284680 ||  || — || September 5, 2008 || Kitt Peak || Spacewatch || V || align=right data-sort-value="0.96" | 960 m || 
|-id=681 bgcolor=#d6d6d6
| 284681 ||  || — || September 6, 2008 || Kitt Peak || Spacewatch || KOR || align=right | 1.6 km || 
|-id=682 bgcolor=#fefefe
| 284682 ||  || — || September 7, 2008 || Catalina || CSS || — || align=right | 1.2 km || 
|-id=683 bgcolor=#fefefe
| 284683 ||  || — || September 22, 2008 || Socorro || LINEAR || FLO || align=right data-sort-value="0.83" | 830 m || 
|-id=684 bgcolor=#fefefe
| 284684 ||  || — || September 22, 2008 || Socorro || LINEAR || — || align=right data-sort-value="0.90" | 900 m || 
|-id=685 bgcolor=#fefefe
| 284685 ||  || — || September 19, 2008 || Kitt Peak || Spacewatch || FLO || align=right data-sort-value="0.72" | 720 m || 
|-id=686 bgcolor=#fefefe
| 284686 ||  || — || September 20, 2008 || Kitt Peak || Spacewatch || — || align=right data-sort-value="0.96" | 960 m || 
|-id=687 bgcolor=#fefefe
| 284687 ||  || — || September 20, 2008 || Kitt Peak || Spacewatch || — || align=right data-sort-value="0.70" | 700 m || 
|-id=688 bgcolor=#fefefe
| 284688 ||  || — || September 20, 2008 || Kitt Peak || Spacewatch || FLO || align=right data-sort-value="0.73" | 730 m || 
|-id=689 bgcolor=#fefefe
| 284689 ||  || — || September 20, 2008 || Kitt Peak || Spacewatch || V || align=right data-sort-value="0.91" | 910 m || 
|-id=690 bgcolor=#fefefe
| 284690 ||  || — || September 21, 2008 || Mount Lemmon || Mount Lemmon Survey || FLO || align=right data-sort-value="0.58" | 580 m || 
|-id=691 bgcolor=#fefefe
| 284691 ||  || — || September 22, 2008 || Mount Lemmon || Mount Lemmon Survey || FLO || align=right data-sort-value="0.86" | 860 m || 
|-id=692 bgcolor=#fefefe
| 284692 ||  || — || September 21, 2008 || Kitt Peak || Spacewatch || — || align=right data-sort-value="0.76" | 760 m || 
|-id=693 bgcolor=#fefefe
| 284693 ||  || — || September 21, 2008 || Kitt Peak || Spacewatch || — || align=right data-sort-value="0.85" | 850 m || 
|-id=694 bgcolor=#fefefe
| 284694 ||  || — || September 21, 2008 || Kitt Peak || Spacewatch || — || align=right | 1.5 km || 
|-id=695 bgcolor=#fefefe
| 284695 ||  || — || September 23, 2008 || Kitt Peak || Spacewatch || ERI || align=right | 2.5 km || 
|-id=696 bgcolor=#fefefe
| 284696 ||  || — || September 24, 2008 || Socorro || LINEAR || — || align=right data-sort-value="0.98" | 980 m || 
|-id=697 bgcolor=#fefefe
| 284697 ||  || — || September 22, 2008 || Catalina || CSS || — || align=right | 1.9 km || 
|-id=698 bgcolor=#fefefe
| 284698 ||  || — || September 25, 2008 || Kitt Peak || Spacewatch || FLO || align=right data-sort-value="0.61" | 610 m || 
|-id=699 bgcolor=#fefefe
| 284699 ||  || — || September 23, 2008 || Mount Lemmon || Mount Lemmon Survey || — || align=right data-sort-value="0.91" | 910 m || 
|-id=700 bgcolor=#fefefe
| 284700 ||  || — || September 29, 2008 || Catalina || CSS || — || align=right data-sort-value="0.96" | 960 m || 
|}

284701–284800 

|-bgcolor=#fefefe
| 284701 ||  || — || September 24, 2008 || Mount Lemmon || Mount Lemmon Survey || — || align=right | 1.2 km || 
|-id=702 bgcolor=#E9E9E9
| 284702 ||  || — || September 29, 2008 || Mount Lemmon || Mount Lemmon Survey || — || align=right | 1.4 km || 
|-id=703 bgcolor=#fefefe
| 284703 ||  || — || September 25, 2008 || Mount Lemmon || Mount Lemmon Survey || — || align=right | 1.5 km || 
|-id=704 bgcolor=#fefefe
| 284704 ||  || — || September 22, 2008 || Kitt Peak || Spacewatch || — || align=right | 1.0 km || 
|-id=705 bgcolor=#fefefe
| 284705 ||  || — || September 22, 2008 || Kitt Peak || Spacewatch || — || align=right data-sort-value="0.75" | 750 m || 
|-id=706 bgcolor=#fefefe
| 284706 ||  || — || September 23, 2008 || Mount Lemmon || Mount Lemmon Survey || NYS || align=right data-sort-value="0.57" | 570 m || 
|-id=707 bgcolor=#fefefe
| 284707 ||  || — || October 1, 2008 || Mount Lemmon || Mount Lemmon Survey || — || align=right data-sort-value="0.78" | 780 m || 
|-id=708 bgcolor=#fefefe
| 284708 ||  || — || October 2, 2008 || Kitt Peak || Spacewatch || — || align=right | 1.0 km || 
|-id=709 bgcolor=#fefefe
| 284709 ||  || — || October 3, 2008 || Kitt Peak || Spacewatch || — || align=right data-sort-value="0.79" | 790 m || 
|-id=710 bgcolor=#fefefe
| 284710 ||  || — || October 6, 2008 || Kitt Peak || Spacewatch || — || align=right data-sort-value="0.88" | 880 m || 
|-id=711 bgcolor=#FA8072
| 284711 ||  || — || October 7, 2008 || Mount Lemmon || Mount Lemmon Survey || — || align=right data-sort-value="0.84" | 840 m || 
|-id=712 bgcolor=#fefefe
| 284712 ||  || — || October 8, 2008 || Mount Lemmon || Mount Lemmon Survey || FLO || align=right data-sort-value="0.66" | 660 m || 
|-id=713 bgcolor=#fefefe
| 284713 ||  || — || October 8, 2008 || Mount Lemmon || Mount Lemmon Survey || — || align=right data-sort-value="0.91" | 910 m || 
|-id=714 bgcolor=#fefefe
| 284714 ||  || — || October 8, 2008 || Kitt Peak || Spacewatch || V || align=right data-sort-value="0.79" | 790 m || 
|-id=715 bgcolor=#fefefe
| 284715 ||  || — || October 8, 2008 || Mount Lemmon || Mount Lemmon Survey || NYS || align=right data-sort-value="0.68" | 680 m || 
|-id=716 bgcolor=#fefefe
| 284716 ||  || — || October 9, 2008 || Mount Lemmon || Mount Lemmon Survey || FLO || align=right data-sort-value="0.62" | 620 m || 
|-id=717 bgcolor=#fefefe
| 284717 ||  || — || October 6, 2008 || Mount Lemmon || Mount Lemmon Survey || — || align=right data-sort-value="0.60" | 600 m || 
|-id=718 bgcolor=#fefefe
| 284718 ||  || — || October 1, 2008 || Socorro || LINEAR || — || align=right data-sort-value="0.89" | 890 m || 
|-id=719 bgcolor=#E9E9E9
| 284719 ||  || — || October 7, 2008 || Mount Lemmon || Mount Lemmon Survey || — || align=right | 2.1 km || 
|-id=720 bgcolor=#d6d6d6
| 284720 ||  || — || October 20, 2008 || Kitt Peak || Spacewatch || HYG || align=right | 3.3 km || 
|-id=721 bgcolor=#fefefe
| 284721 ||  || — || October 20, 2008 || Mount Lemmon || Mount Lemmon Survey || MAS || align=right | 1.0 km || 
|-id=722 bgcolor=#fefefe
| 284722 ||  || — || October 20, 2008 || Mount Lemmon || Mount Lemmon Survey || — || align=right data-sort-value="0.68" | 680 m || 
|-id=723 bgcolor=#E9E9E9
| 284723 ||  || — || October 20, 2008 || Kitt Peak || Spacewatch || — || align=right | 1.4 km || 
|-id=724 bgcolor=#fefefe
| 284724 ||  || — || October 21, 2008 || Kitt Peak || Spacewatch || MAS || align=right data-sort-value="0.97" | 970 m || 
|-id=725 bgcolor=#fefefe
| 284725 ||  || — || October 21, 2008 || Mount Lemmon || Mount Lemmon Survey || FLO || align=right data-sort-value="0.69" | 690 m || 
|-id=726 bgcolor=#fefefe
| 284726 ||  || — || October 22, 2008 || Kitt Peak || Spacewatch || — || align=right data-sort-value="0.76" | 760 m || 
|-id=727 bgcolor=#E9E9E9
| 284727 ||  || — || October 22, 2008 || Kitt Peak || Spacewatch || — || align=right | 1.3 km || 
|-id=728 bgcolor=#fefefe
| 284728 ||  || — || October 22, 2008 || Kitt Peak || Spacewatch || MAS || align=right data-sort-value="0.83" | 830 m || 
|-id=729 bgcolor=#fefefe
| 284729 ||  || — || October 23, 2008 || Kitt Peak || Spacewatch || V || align=right data-sort-value="0.70" | 700 m || 
|-id=730 bgcolor=#fefefe
| 284730 ||  || — || October 23, 2008 || Kitt Peak || Spacewatch || — || align=right data-sort-value="0.82" | 820 m || 
|-id=731 bgcolor=#fefefe
| 284731 ||  || — || October 23, 2008 || Kitt Peak || Spacewatch || — || align=right data-sort-value="0.83" | 830 m || 
|-id=732 bgcolor=#fefefe
| 284732 ||  || — || October 23, 2008 || Kitt Peak || Spacewatch || — || align=right | 2.2 km || 
|-id=733 bgcolor=#fefefe
| 284733 ||  || — || October 23, 2008 || Kitt Peak || Spacewatch || V || align=right data-sort-value="0.68" | 680 m || 
|-id=734 bgcolor=#fefefe
| 284734 ||  || — || October 23, 2008 || Mount Lemmon || Mount Lemmon Survey || — || align=right data-sort-value="0.85" | 850 m || 
|-id=735 bgcolor=#fefefe
| 284735 ||  || — || October 23, 2008 || Mount Lemmon || Mount Lemmon Survey || V || align=right data-sort-value="0.78" | 780 m || 
|-id=736 bgcolor=#fefefe
| 284736 ||  || — || October 24, 2008 || Mount Lemmon || Mount Lemmon Survey || — || align=right data-sort-value="0.80" | 800 m || 
|-id=737 bgcolor=#E9E9E9
| 284737 ||  || — || October 24, 2008 || Kitt Peak || Spacewatch || — || align=right | 1.2 km || 
|-id=738 bgcolor=#E9E9E9
| 284738 ||  || — || October 24, 2008 || Kitt Peak || Spacewatch || — || align=right | 1.7 km || 
|-id=739 bgcolor=#E9E9E9
| 284739 ||  || — || October 27, 2008 || Kitt Peak || Spacewatch || — || align=right | 2.0 km || 
|-id=740 bgcolor=#fefefe
| 284740 ||  || — || October 25, 2008 || Socorro || LINEAR || — || align=right data-sort-value="0.99" | 990 m || 
|-id=741 bgcolor=#fefefe
| 284741 ||  || — || October 28, 2008 || Socorro || LINEAR || V || align=right data-sort-value="0.94" | 940 m || 
|-id=742 bgcolor=#fefefe
| 284742 ||  || — || October 28, 2008 || Socorro || LINEAR || V || align=right data-sort-value="0.77" | 770 m || 
|-id=743 bgcolor=#fefefe
| 284743 ||  || — || October 23, 2008 || Kitt Peak || Spacewatch || — || align=right | 1.0 km || 
|-id=744 bgcolor=#fefefe
| 284744 ||  || — || October 23, 2008 || Mount Lemmon || Mount Lemmon Survey || — || align=right data-sort-value="0.99" | 990 m || 
|-id=745 bgcolor=#E9E9E9
| 284745 ||  || — || October 26, 2008 || Kitt Peak || Spacewatch || — || align=right | 1.5 km || 
|-id=746 bgcolor=#E9E9E9
| 284746 ||  || — || October 29, 2008 || Kitt Peak || Spacewatch || — || align=right | 1.1 km || 
|-id=747 bgcolor=#d6d6d6
| 284747 ||  || — || October 29, 2008 || Kitt Peak || Spacewatch || EOS || align=right | 2.9 km || 
|-id=748 bgcolor=#fefefe
| 284748 ||  || — || October 31, 2008 || Kitt Peak || Spacewatch || — || align=right data-sort-value="0.71" | 710 m || 
|-id=749 bgcolor=#E9E9E9
| 284749 ||  || — || October 28, 2008 || Kitt Peak || Spacewatch || — || align=right | 1.1 km || 
|-id=750 bgcolor=#E9E9E9
| 284750 ||  || — || October 31, 2008 || Catalina || CSS || MAR || align=right | 1.8 km || 
|-id=751 bgcolor=#E9E9E9
| 284751 ||  || — || October 31, 2008 || Socorro || LINEAR || — || align=right | 1.4 km || 
|-id=752 bgcolor=#FA8072
| 284752 ||  || — || November 2, 2008 || Socorro || LINEAR || — || align=right data-sort-value="0.67" | 670 m || 
|-id=753 bgcolor=#fefefe
| 284753 ||  || — || November 2, 2008 || Mount Lemmon || Mount Lemmon Survey || FLO || align=right data-sort-value="0.75" | 750 m || 
|-id=754 bgcolor=#fefefe
| 284754 ||  || — || November 6, 2008 || Andrushivka || Andrushivka Obs. || — || align=right data-sort-value="0.85" | 850 m || 
|-id=755 bgcolor=#E9E9E9
| 284755 ||  || — || November 1, 2008 || Mount Lemmon || Mount Lemmon Survey || — || align=right | 3.0 km || 
|-id=756 bgcolor=#fefefe
| 284756 ||  || — || November 1, 2008 || Kitt Peak || Spacewatch || V || align=right data-sort-value="0.92" | 920 m || 
|-id=757 bgcolor=#E9E9E9
| 284757 ||  || — || November 2, 2008 || Kitt Peak || Spacewatch || — || align=right | 1.4 km || 
|-id=758 bgcolor=#fefefe
| 284758 ||  || — || November 10, 2008 || La Sagra || OAM Obs. || — || align=right | 1.1 km || 
|-id=759 bgcolor=#E9E9E9
| 284759 ||  || — || November 18, 2008 || Dauban || F. Kugel || — || align=right | 1.6 km || 
|-id=760 bgcolor=#fefefe
| 284760 ||  || — || November 17, 2008 || Kitt Peak || Spacewatch || V || align=right data-sort-value="0.85" | 850 m || 
|-id=761 bgcolor=#fefefe
| 284761 ||  || — || November 17, 2008 || Kitt Peak || Spacewatch || MAS || align=right data-sort-value="0.82" | 820 m || 
|-id=762 bgcolor=#E9E9E9
| 284762 ||  || — || November 17, 2008 || Kitt Peak || Spacewatch || — || align=right | 1.2 km || 
|-id=763 bgcolor=#FA8072
| 284763 ||  || — || November 18, 2008 || Kitt Peak || Spacewatch || — || align=right data-sort-value="0.76" | 760 m || 
|-id=764 bgcolor=#E9E9E9
| 284764 ||  || — || November 18, 2008 || Kitt Peak || Spacewatch || — || align=right | 3.3 km || 
|-id=765 bgcolor=#E9E9E9
| 284765 ||  || — || November 18, 2008 || Kitt Peak || Spacewatch || — || align=right | 1.0 km || 
|-id=766 bgcolor=#E9E9E9
| 284766 ||  || — || November 19, 2008 || Mount Lemmon || Mount Lemmon Survey || — || align=right | 1.2 km || 
|-id=767 bgcolor=#E9E9E9
| 284767 ||  || — || November 27, 2008 || Črni Vrh || Črni Vrh || HNS || align=right | 1.7 km || 
|-id=768 bgcolor=#E9E9E9
| 284768 ||  || — || November 30, 2008 || Kitt Peak || Spacewatch || — || align=right | 1.7 km || 
|-id=769 bgcolor=#fefefe
| 284769 ||  || — || November 30, 2008 || Kitt Peak || Spacewatch || MAS || align=right data-sort-value="0.71" | 710 m || 
|-id=770 bgcolor=#E9E9E9
| 284770 ||  || — || November 30, 2008 || Mount Lemmon || Mount Lemmon Survey || — || align=right | 1.7 km || 
|-id=771 bgcolor=#E9E9E9
| 284771 ||  || — || November 30, 2008 || Kitt Peak || Spacewatch || — || align=right | 2.7 km || 
|-id=772 bgcolor=#d6d6d6
| 284772 ||  || — || November 30, 2008 || Kitt Peak || Spacewatch || — || align=right | 4.5 km || 
|-id=773 bgcolor=#d6d6d6
| 284773 ||  || — || November 30, 2008 || Kitt Peak || Spacewatch || — || align=right | 4.5 km || 
|-id=774 bgcolor=#d6d6d6
| 284774 ||  || — || November 24, 2008 || Mount Lemmon || Mount Lemmon Survey || — || align=right | 3.0 km || 
|-id=775 bgcolor=#fefefe
| 284775 ||  || — || November 18, 2008 || Socorro || LINEAR || — || align=right | 1.0 km || 
|-id=776 bgcolor=#E9E9E9
| 284776 ||  || — || December 2, 2008 || Dauban || F. Kugel || — || align=right | 2.0 km || 
|-id=777 bgcolor=#fefefe
| 284777 ||  || — || December 2, 2008 || Socorro || LINEAR || NYS || align=right data-sort-value="0.74" | 740 m || 
|-id=778 bgcolor=#E9E9E9
| 284778 ||  || — || December 2, 2008 || Kitt Peak || Spacewatch || — || align=right | 1.6 km || 
|-id=779 bgcolor=#E9E9E9
| 284779 ||  || — || December 7, 2008 || Mount Lemmon || Mount Lemmon Survey || — || align=right | 1.8 km || 
|-id=780 bgcolor=#E9E9E9
| 284780 ||  || — || December 2, 2008 || Kitt Peak || Spacewatch || — || align=right | 2.4 km || 
|-id=781 bgcolor=#d6d6d6
| 284781 ||  || — || December 21, 2008 || Mount Lemmon || Mount Lemmon Survey || — || align=right | 3.2 km || 
|-id=782 bgcolor=#E9E9E9
| 284782 ||  || — || December 21, 2008 || Mount Lemmon || Mount Lemmon Survey || HOF || align=right | 3.5 km || 
|-id=783 bgcolor=#E9E9E9
| 284783 ||  || — || December 22, 2008 || Kitt Peak || Spacewatch || — || align=right | 1.2 km || 
|-id=784 bgcolor=#E9E9E9
| 284784 ||  || — || December 29, 2008 || Kitt Peak || Spacewatch || — || align=right | 1.3 km || 
|-id=785 bgcolor=#E9E9E9
| 284785 ||  || — || December 29, 2008 || Mount Lemmon || Mount Lemmon Survey || — || align=right | 3.3 km || 
|-id=786 bgcolor=#d6d6d6
| 284786 ||  || — || December 29, 2008 || Mount Lemmon || Mount Lemmon Survey || — || align=right | 3.3 km || 
|-id=787 bgcolor=#d6d6d6
| 284787 ||  || — || December 29, 2008 || Mount Lemmon || Mount Lemmon Survey || — || align=right | 3.7 km || 
|-id=788 bgcolor=#E9E9E9
| 284788 ||  || — || December 29, 2008 || Mount Lemmon || Mount Lemmon Survey || HOF || align=right | 3.3 km || 
|-id=789 bgcolor=#E9E9E9
| 284789 ||  || — || December 30, 2008 || Kitt Peak || Spacewatch || HNA || align=right | 3.0 km || 
|-id=790 bgcolor=#E9E9E9
| 284790 ||  || — || December 30, 2008 || Mount Lemmon || Mount Lemmon Survey || — || align=right | 2.6 km || 
|-id=791 bgcolor=#E9E9E9
| 284791 ||  || — || December 30, 2008 || Mount Lemmon || Mount Lemmon Survey || — || align=right | 1.8 km || 
|-id=792 bgcolor=#d6d6d6
| 284792 ||  || — || December 30, 2008 || Mount Lemmon || Mount Lemmon Survey || EOS || align=right | 2.3 km || 
|-id=793 bgcolor=#d6d6d6
| 284793 ||  || — || December 30, 2008 || Kitt Peak || Spacewatch || — || align=right | 2.3 km || 
|-id=794 bgcolor=#fefefe
| 284794 ||  || — || December 31, 2008 || Kitt Peak || Spacewatch || NYS || align=right data-sort-value="0.97" | 970 m || 
|-id=795 bgcolor=#d6d6d6
| 284795 ||  || — || December 31, 2008 || Kitt Peak || Spacewatch || KOR || align=right | 1.4 km || 
|-id=796 bgcolor=#d6d6d6
| 284796 ||  || — || December 29, 2008 || Mount Lemmon || Mount Lemmon Survey || EOS || align=right | 2.6 km || 
|-id=797 bgcolor=#fefefe
| 284797 ||  || — || December 29, 2008 || Kitt Peak || Spacewatch || NYS || align=right data-sort-value="0.79" | 790 m || 
|-id=798 bgcolor=#d6d6d6
| 284798 ||  || — || December 29, 2008 || Kitt Peak || Spacewatch || — || align=right | 3.2 km || 
|-id=799 bgcolor=#E9E9E9
| 284799 ||  || — || December 29, 2008 || Kitt Peak || Spacewatch || — || align=right | 1.2 km || 
|-id=800 bgcolor=#E9E9E9
| 284800 ||  || — || December 31, 2008 || Mount Lemmon || Mount Lemmon Survey || — || align=right | 1.6 km || 
|}

284801–284900 

|-bgcolor=#E9E9E9
| 284801 ||  || — || December 29, 2008 || Kitt Peak || Spacewatch || — || align=right | 1.8 km || 
|-id=802 bgcolor=#E9E9E9
| 284802 ||  || — || December 29, 2008 || Mount Lemmon || Mount Lemmon Survey || — || align=right | 3.4 km || 
|-id=803 bgcolor=#d6d6d6
| 284803 ||  || — || December 29, 2008 || Kitt Peak || Spacewatch || — || align=right | 4.0 km || 
|-id=804 bgcolor=#E9E9E9
| 284804 ||  || — || December 30, 2008 || Kitt Peak || Spacewatch || — || align=right | 1.7 km || 
|-id=805 bgcolor=#E9E9E9
| 284805 ||  || — || December 30, 2008 || Kitt Peak || Spacewatch || WIT || align=right | 1.1 km || 
|-id=806 bgcolor=#d6d6d6
| 284806 ||  || — || December 30, 2008 || Kitt Peak || Spacewatch || CHA || align=right | 2.9 km || 
|-id=807 bgcolor=#E9E9E9
| 284807 ||  || — || December 30, 2008 || Kitt Peak || Spacewatch || AGN || align=right | 1.2 km || 
|-id=808 bgcolor=#fefefe
| 284808 ||  || — || December 30, 2008 || Kitt Peak || Spacewatch || — || align=right data-sort-value="0.90" | 900 m || 
|-id=809 bgcolor=#E9E9E9
| 284809 ||  || — || December 30, 2008 || Kitt Peak || Spacewatch || — || align=right | 2.9 km || 
|-id=810 bgcolor=#d6d6d6
| 284810 ||  || — || December 30, 2008 || Kitt Peak || Spacewatch || — || align=right | 2.9 km || 
|-id=811 bgcolor=#d6d6d6
| 284811 ||  || — || December 30, 2008 || Mount Lemmon || Mount Lemmon Survey || — || align=right | 5.6 km || 
|-id=812 bgcolor=#E9E9E9
| 284812 ||  || — || December 30, 2008 || Kitt Peak || Spacewatch || — || align=right | 2.2 km || 
|-id=813 bgcolor=#E9E9E9
| 284813 ||  || — || December 22, 2008 || Catalina || CSS || HNS || align=right | 1.5 km || 
|-id=814 bgcolor=#d6d6d6
| 284814 ||  || — || December 22, 2008 || Kitt Peak || Spacewatch || — || align=right | 3.0 km || 
|-id=815 bgcolor=#d6d6d6
| 284815 ||  || — || December 29, 2008 || Mount Lemmon || Mount Lemmon Survey || LIX || align=right | 4.7 km || 
|-id=816 bgcolor=#E9E9E9
| 284816 ||  || — || December 21, 2008 || Kitt Peak || Spacewatch || — || align=right | 1.4 km || 
|-id=817 bgcolor=#d6d6d6
| 284817 ||  || — || December 29, 2008 || Mount Lemmon || Mount Lemmon Survey || — || align=right | 3.4 km || 
|-id=818 bgcolor=#E9E9E9
| 284818 ||  || — || December 30, 2008 || Mount Lemmon || Mount Lemmon Survey || NEM || align=right | 2.3 km || 
|-id=819 bgcolor=#d6d6d6
| 284819 ||  || — || December 22, 2008 || Mount Lemmon || Mount Lemmon Survey || — || align=right | 3.1 km || 
|-id=820 bgcolor=#d6d6d6
| 284820 ||  || — || December 22, 2008 || Catalina || CSS || — || align=right | 4.4 km || 
|-id=821 bgcolor=#E9E9E9
| 284821 ||  || — || December 30, 2008 || Catalina || CSS || BRG || align=right | 2.0 km || 
|-id=822 bgcolor=#d6d6d6
| 284822 ||  || — || December 22, 2008 || Kitt Peak || Spacewatch || — || align=right | 3.6 km || 
|-id=823 bgcolor=#d6d6d6
| 284823 ||  || — || January 15, 2009 || Kitt Peak || Spacewatch || URS || align=right | 4.1 km || 
|-id=824 bgcolor=#d6d6d6
| 284824 ||  || — || January 15, 2009 || Kitt Peak || Spacewatch || EOS || align=right | 1.9 km || 
|-id=825 bgcolor=#E9E9E9
| 284825 ||  || — || January 2, 2009 || Mount Lemmon || Mount Lemmon Survey || — || align=right | 2.1 km || 
|-id=826 bgcolor=#d6d6d6
| 284826 ||  || — || January 3, 2009 || Mount Lemmon || Mount Lemmon Survey || EOS || align=right | 3.0 km || 
|-id=827 bgcolor=#E9E9E9
| 284827 ||  || — || January 3, 2009 || Mount Lemmon || Mount Lemmon Survey || — || align=right | 2.4 km || 
|-id=828 bgcolor=#d6d6d6
| 284828 ||  || — || January 7, 2009 || Kitt Peak || Spacewatch || CHA || align=right | 2.3 km || 
|-id=829 bgcolor=#d6d6d6
| 284829 ||  || — || January 18, 2009 || Socorro || LINEAR || — || align=right | 3.9 km || 
|-id=830 bgcolor=#fefefe
| 284830 ||  || — || January 17, 2009 || Socorro || LINEAR || — || align=right | 2.0 km || 
|-id=831 bgcolor=#E9E9E9
| 284831 ||  || — || January 16, 2009 || Mount Lemmon || Mount Lemmon Survey || — || align=right data-sort-value="0.90" | 900 m || 
|-id=832 bgcolor=#d6d6d6
| 284832 ||  || — || January 17, 2009 || Mount Lemmon || Mount Lemmon Survey || — || align=right | 2.5 km || 
|-id=833 bgcolor=#E9E9E9
| 284833 ||  || — || January 16, 2009 || Kitt Peak || Spacewatch || — || align=right | 1.4 km || 
|-id=834 bgcolor=#d6d6d6
| 284834 ||  || — || January 16, 2009 || Kitt Peak || Spacewatch || — || align=right | 3.6 km || 
|-id=835 bgcolor=#d6d6d6
| 284835 ||  || — || January 16, 2009 || Kitt Peak || Spacewatch || — || align=right | 5.2 km || 
|-id=836 bgcolor=#d6d6d6
| 284836 ||  || — || January 16, 2009 || Kitt Peak || Spacewatch || BRA || align=right | 1.6 km || 
|-id=837 bgcolor=#E9E9E9
| 284837 ||  || — || January 16, 2009 || Kitt Peak || Spacewatch || — || align=right | 3.5 km || 
|-id=838 bgcolor=#E9E9E9
| 284838 ||  || — || January 23, 2009 || Purple Mountain || PMO NEO || — || align=right | 1.3 km || 
|-id=839 bgcolor=#d6d6d6
| 284839 ||  || — || January 25, 2009 || Kitt Peak || Spacewatch || VER || align=right | 4.5 km || 
|-id=840 bgcolor=#E9E9E9
| 284840 ||  || — || January 25, 2009 || Catalina || CSS || EUN || align=right | 1.2 km || 
|-id=841 bgcolor=#E9E9E9
| 284841 ||  || — || January 25, 2009 || Socorro || LINEAR || HNS || align=right | 1.9 km || 
|-id=842 bgcolor=#E9E9E9
| 284842 ||  || — || January 29, 2009 || Bergisch Gladbac || W. Bickel || — || align=right | 1.2 km || 
|-id=843 bgcolor=#E9E9E9
| 284843 ||  || — || January 20, 2009 || Catalina || CSS || ADE || align=right | 3.2 km || 
|-id=844 bgcolor=#d6d6d6
| 284844 ||  || — || January 25, 2009 || Kitt Peak || Spacewatch || — || align=right | 3.9 km || 
|-id=845 bgcolor=#d6d6d6
| 284845 ||  || — || January 25, 2009 || Kitt Peak || Spacewatch || — || align=right | 3.2 km || 
|-id=846 bgcolor=#d6d6d6
| 284846 ||  || — || January 25, 2009 || Kitt Peak || Spacewatch || — || align=right | 3.5 km || 
|-id=847 bgcolor=#d6d6d6
| 284847 ||  || — || January 25, 2009 || Kitt Peak || Spacewatch || — || align=right | 3.1 km || 
|-id=848 bgcolor=#d6d6d6
| 284848 ||  || — || January 25, 2009 || Kitt Peak || Spacewatch || — || align=right | 3.2 km || 
|-id=849 bgcolor=#E9E9E9
| 284849 ||  || — || January 25, 2009 || Kitt Peak || Spacewatch || — || align=right | 2.9 km || 
|-id=850 bgcolor=#d6d6d6
| 284850 ||  || — || January 25, 2009 || Kitt Peak || Spacewatch || VER || align=right | 3.2 km || 
|-id=851 bgcolor=#d6d6d6
| 284851 ||  || — || January 31, 2009 || Kitt Peak || Spacewatch || — || align=right | 4.6 km || 
|-id=852 bgcolor=#d6d6d6
| 284852 ||  || — || January 29, 2009 || Mount Lemmon || Mount Lemmon Survey || — || align=right | 4.3 km || 
|-id=853 bgcolor=#d6d6d6
| 284853 ||  || — || January 29, 2009 || Kitt Peak || Spacewatch || EOS || align=right | 2.8 km || 
|-id=854 bgcolor=#E9E9E9
| 284854 ||  || — || January 29, 2009 || Kitt Peak || Spacewatch || — || align=right | 1.1 km || 
|-id=855 bgcolor=#E9E9E9
| 284855 ||  || — || January 30, 2009 || Kitt Peak || Spacewatch || — || align=right | 2.0 km || 
|-id=856 bgcolor=#d6d6d6
| 284856 ||  || — || January 30, 2009 || Mount Lemmon || Mount Lemmon Survey || — || align=right | 3.3 km || 
|-id=857 bgcolor=#d6d6d6
| 284857 ||  || — || January 31, 2009 || Kitt Peak || Spacewatch || EOS || align=right | 2.9 km || 
|-id=858 bgcolor=#E9E9E9
| 284858 ||  || — || January 31, 2009 || Kitt Peak || Spacewatch || EUN || align=right | 1.4 km || 
|-id=859 bgcolor=#d6d6d6
| 284859 ||  || — || January 31, 2009 || Cerro Burek || Alianza S4 Obs. || — || align=right | 4.1 km || 
|-id=860 bgcolor=#E9E9E9
| 284860 ||  || — || January 18, 2009 || Kitt Peak || Spacewatch || BRG || align=right | 1.7 km || 
|-id=861 bgcolor=#d6d6d6
| 284861 ||  || — || January 30, 2009 || Mount Lemmon || Mount Lemmon Survey || — || align=right | 3.4 km || 
|-id=862 bgcolor=#d6d6d6
| 284862 ||  || — || January 20, 2009 || Mount Lemmon || Mount Lemmon Survey || HYG || align=right | 3.3 km || 
|-id=863 bgcolor=#d6d6d6
| 284863 ||  || — || February 2, 2009 || Moletai || K. Černis, J. Zdanavičius || EOS || align=right | 2.4 km || 
|-id=864 bgcolor=#E9E9E9
| 284864 ||  || — || February 1, 2009 || Kitt Peak || Spacewatch || — || align=right | 1.8 km || 
|-id=865 bgcolor=#d6d6d6
| 284865 ||  || — || February 1, 2009 || Kitt Peak || Spacewatch || — || align=right | 4.6 km || 
|-id=866 bgcolor=#d6d6d6
| 284866 ||  || — || February 14, 2009 || Catalina || CSS || EOS || align=right | 3.4 km || 
|-id=867 bgcolor=#d6d6d6
| 284867 ||  || — || February 13, 2009 || Kitt Peak || Spacewatch || — || align=right | 3.3 km || 
|-id=868 bgcolor=#E9E9E9
| 284868 ||  || — || February 14, 2009 || Kitt Peak || Spacewatch || RAF || align=right | 1.2 km || 
|-id=869 bgcolor=#d6d6d6
| 284869 ||  || — || February 14, 2009 || Mount Lemmon || Mount Lemmon Survey || — || align=right | 3.7 km || 
|-id=870 bgcolor=#d6d6d6
| 284870 ||  || — || February 4, 2009 || Kitt Peak || Spacewatch || — || align=right | 3.8 km || 
|-id=871 bgcolor=#d6d6d6
| 284871 ||  || — || February 3, 2009 || Kitt Peak || Spacewatch || EOS || align=right | 2.2 km || 
|-id=872 bgcolor=#E9E9E9
| 284872 ||  || — || February 16, 2009 || Dauban || F. Kugel || — || align=right | 1.7 km || 
|-id=873 bgcolor=#E9E9E9
| 284873 ||  || — || February 23, 2009 || Calar Alto || F. Hormuth || GEF || align=right | 1.2 km || 
|-id=874 bgcolor=#d6d6d6
| 284874 ||  || — || February 20, 2009 || Dauban || F. Kugel || — || align=right | 2.8 km || 
|-id=875 bgcolor=#d6d6d6
| 284875 ||  || — || February 18, 2009 || La Sagra || OAM Obs. || — || align=right | 5.1 km || 
|-id=876 bgcolor=#d6d6d6
| 284876 ||  || — || February 18, 2009 || La Sagra || OAM Obs. || — || align=right | 4.4 km || 
|-id=877 bgcolor=#d6d6d6
| 284877 ||  || — || February 24, 2009 || Mount Lemmon || Mount Lemmon Survey || — || align=right | 3.0 km || 
|-id=878 bgcolor=#E9E9E9
| 284878 ||  || — || December 6, 2008 || Kitt Peak || Spacewatch || — || align=right | 2.4 km || 
|-id=879 bgcolor=#d6d6d6
| 284879 ||  || — || February 28, 2009 || Mount Lemmon || Mount Lemmon Survey || — || align=right | 4.1 km || 
|-id=880 bgcolor=#d6d6d6
| 284880 ||  || — || February 20, 2009 || Kitt Peak || Spacewatch || — || align=right | 4.0 km || 
|-id=881 bgcolor=#d6d6d6
| 284881 ||  || — || March 15, 2009 || La Sagra || OAM Obs. || — || align=right | 4.4 km || 
|-id=882 bgcolor=#C2FFFF
| 284882 ||  || — || March 31, 2009 || Mount Lemmon || Mount Lemmon Survey || L5 || align=right | 11 km || 
|-id=883 bgcolor=#C2FFFF
| 284883 ||  || — || March 26, 2009 || Kitt Peak || Spacewatch || L5 || align=right | 12 km || 
|-id=884 bgcolor=#d6d6d6
| 284884 ||  || — || April 18, 2009 || Kitt Peak || Spacewatch || — || align=right | 3.9 km || 
|-id=885 bgcolor=#d6d6d6
| 284885 ||  || — || April 21, 2009 || Kitt Peak || Spacewatch || — || align=right | 3.4 km || 
|-id=886 bgcolor=#d6d6d6
| 284886 ||  || — || May 13, 2009 || Kitt Peak || Spacewatch || EUP || align=right | 3.7 km || 
|-id=887 bgcolor=#C2FFFF
| 284887 ||  || — || May 24, 2009 || Catalina || CSS || L5 || align=right | 16 km || 
|-id=888 bgcolor=#fefefe
| 284888 ||  || — || August 16, 2009 || Kitt Peak || Spacewatch || — || align=right | 1.1 km || 
|-id=889 bgcolor=#fefefe
| 284889 ||  || — || August 27, 2009 || Kitt Peak || Spacewatch || MAS || align=right data-sort-value="0.82" | 820 m || 
|-id=890 bgcolor=#d6d6d6
| 284890 ||  || — || August 17, 2009 || Kitt Peak || Spacewatch || EUP || align=right | 3.6 km || 
|-id=891 bgcolor=#d6d6d6
| 284891 Kona ||  ||  || September 13, 2009 || ESA OGS || ESA OGS || TIR || align=right | 3.6 km || 
|-id=892 bgcolor=#fefefe
| 284892 ||  || — || September 18, 2009 || Mount Lemmon || Mount Lemmon Survey || MAS || align=right data-sort-value="0.90" | 900 m || 
|-id=893 bgcolor=#d6d6d6
| 284893 ||  || — || September 18, 2009 || Kitt Peak || Spacewatch || — || align=right | 2.3 km || 
|-id=894 bgcolor=#fefefe
| 284894 ||  || — || September 20, 2009 || Catalina || CSS || — || align=right | 1.5 km || 
|-id=895 bgcolor=#d6d6d6
| 284895 ||  || — || September 23, 2009 || Uccle || T. Pauwels || — || align=right | 5.1 km || 
|-id=896 bgcolor=#E9E9E9
| 284896 ||  || — || September 28, 2009 || Catalina || CSS || — || align=right | 3.8 km || 
|-id=897 bgcolor=#fefefe
| 284897 ||  || — || September 20, 2009 || Kitt Peak || Spacewatch || — || align=right data-sort-value="0.87" | 870 m || 
|-id=898 bgcolor=#E9E9E9
| 284898 ||  || — || October 10, 2009 || La Sagra || OAM Obs. || — || align=right | 1.6 km || 
|-id=899 bgcolor=#d6d6d6
| 284899 ||  || — || October 21, 2009 || Bisei SG Center || BATTeRS || — || align=right | 3.3 km || 
|-id=900 bgcolor=#E9E9E9
| 284900 ||  || — || October 22, 2009 || Catalina || CSS || — || align=right | 2.4 km || 
|}

284901–285000 

|-bgcolor=#d6d6d6
| 284901 ||  || — || October 18, 2009 || Mount Lemmon || Mount Lemmon Survey || THM || align=right | 2.2 km || 
|-id=902 bgcolor=#d6d6d6
| 284902 ||  || — || November 8, 2009 || Mount Lemmon || Mount Lemmon Survey || — || align=right | 3.5 km || 
|-id=903 bgcolor=#E9E9E9
| 284903 ||  || — || November 9, 2009 || Mount Lemmon || Mount Lemmon Survey || — || align=right | 2.7 km || 
|-id=904 bgcolor=#d6d6d6
| 284904 ||  || — || November 9, 2009 || Kitt Peak || Spacewatch || — || align=right | 3.2 km || 
|-id=905 bgcolor=#E9E9E9
| 284905 ||  || — || November 12, 2009 || La Sagra || OAM Obs. || HOF || align=right | 4.9 km || 
|-id=906 bgcolor=#FA8072
| 284906 ||  || — || December 10, 2009 || Mount Lemmon || Mount Lemmon Survey || H || align=right | 1.2 km || 
|-id=907 bgcolor=#fefefe
| 284907 ||  || — || December 15, 2009 || Mount Lemmon || Mount Lemmon Survey || — || align=right | 1.2 km || 
|-id=908 bgcolor=#fefefe
| 284908 ||  || — || December 19, 2009 || Mount Lemmon || Mount Lemmon Survey || — || align=right | 1.6 km || 
|-id=909 bgcolor=#fefefe
| 284909 ||  || — || December 26, 2009 || Kitt Peak || Spacewatch || FLO || align=right data-sort-value="0.65" | 650 m || 
|-id=910 bgcolor=#fefefe
| 284910 ||  || — || January 6, 2010 || Kitt Peak || Spacewatch || FLO || align=right | 1.4 km || 
|-id=911 bgcolor=#fefefe
| 284911 ||  || — || January 7, 2010 || Kitt Peak || Spacewatch || NYS || align=right data-sort-value="0.75" | 750 m || 
|-id=912 bgcolor=#fefefe
| 284912 ||  || — || January 11, 2010 || Kitt Peak || Spacewatch || — || align=right | 1.0 km || 
|-id=913 bgcolor=#fefefe
| 284913 ||  || — || January 13, 2010 || Socorro || LINEAR || — || align=right | 1.3 km || 
|-id=914 bgcolor=#fefefe
| 284914 ||  || — || January 8, 2010 || Kitt Peak || Spacewatch || H || align=right data-sort-value="0.76" | 760 m || 
|-id=915 bgcolor=#E9E9E9
| 284915 ||  || — || January 8, 2010 || WISE || WISE || — || align=right | 3.4 km || 
|-id=916 bgcolor=#d6d6d6
| 284916 ||  || — || March 19, 2001 || Apache Point || SDSS || VER || align=right | 4.8 km || 
|-id=917 bgcolor=#E9E9E9
| 284917 ||  || — || January 23, 2010 || Bisei SG Center || BATTeRS || JUN || align=right | 1.4 km || 
|-id=918 bgcolor=#d6d6d6
| 284918 ||  || — || January 16, 2010 || WISE || WISE || — || align=right | 3.2 km || 
|-id=919 bgcolor=#d6d6d6
| 284919 Kaçar ||  ||  || January 25, 2010 || WISE || WISE || — || align=right | 5.5 km || 
|-id=920 bgcolor=#d6d6d6
| 284920 ||  || — || February 12, 2010 || WISE || WISE || — || align=right | 4.4 km || 
|-id=921 bgcolor=#fefefe
| 284921 ||  || — || February 13, 2010 || Socorro || LINEAR || — || align=right data-sort-value="0.94" | 940 m || 
|-id=922 bgcolor=#E9E9E9
| 284922 ||  || — || February 13, 2010 || Kitt Peak || Spacewatch || — || align=right | 2.1 km || 
|-id=923 bgcolor=#E9E9E9
| 284923 ||  || — || February 13, 2010 || Kitt Peak || Spacewatch || — || align=right | 2.0 km || 
|-id=924 bgcolor=#fefefe
| 284924 ||  || — || February 14, 2010 || Mount Lemmon || Mount Lemmon Survey || V || align=right data-sort-value="0.78" | 780 m || 
|-id=925 bgcolor=#E9E9E9
| 284925 ||  || — || February 14, 2010 || Kitt Peak || Spacewatch || — || align=right | 2.4 km || 
|-id=926 bgcolor=#d6d6d6
| 284926 ||  || — || February 9, 2010 || Catalina || CSS || — || align=right | 5.6 km || 
|-id=927 bgcolor=#E9E9E9
| 284927 ||  || — || February 14, 2010 || Catalina || CSS || — || align=right | 1.9 km || 
|-id=928 bgcolor=#fefefe
| 284928 ||  || — || February 15, 2010 || Kitt Peak || Spacewatch || — || align=right | 1.3 km || 
|-id=929 bgcolor=#fefefe
| 284929 ||  || — || February 7, 2010 || La Sagra || OAM Obs. || — || align=right | 1.0 km || 
|-id=930 bgcolor=#d6d6d6
| 284930 ||  || — || February 8, 2010 || WISE || WISE || EUP || align=right | 5.6 km || 
|-id=931 bgcolor=#fefefe
| 284931 || 2010 DR || — || February 16, 2010 || Mayhill || A. Lowe || — || align=right | 2.9 km || 
|-id=932 bgcolor=#fefefe
| 284932 ||  || — || February 16, 2010 || Catalina || CSS || — || align=right | 1.3 km || 
|-id=933 bgcolor=#E9E9E9
| 284933 ||  || — || February 16, 2010 || Kitt Peak || Spacewatch || — || align=right | 1.1 km || 
|-id=934 bgcolor=#d6d6d6
| 284934 ||  || — || January 17, 2008 || Mount Lemmon || Mount Lemmon Survey || EUP || align=right | 5.4 km || 
|-id=935 bgcolor=#d6d6d6
| 284935 ||  || — || February 21, 2010 || WISE || WISE || — || align=right | 4.1 km || 
|-id=936 bgcolor=#d6d6d6
| 284936 ||  || — || February 21, 2010 || WISE || WISE || 7:4 || align=right | 4.7 km || 
|-id=937 bgcolor=#d6d6d6
| 284937 ||  || — || February 23, 2010 || WISE || WISE || 7:4 || align=right | 6.5 km || 
|-id=938 bgcolor=#fefefe
| 284938 ||  || — || February 24, 2010 || Kitt Peak || Spacewatch || — || align=right | 1.2 km || 
|-id=939 bgcolor=#E9E9E9
| 284939 ||  || — || February 17, 2010 || Kitt Peak || Spacewatch || — || align=right | 1.3 km || 
|-id=940 bgcolor=#fefefe
| 284940 ||  || — || March 3, 2010 || Nazaret || G. Muler || V || align=right data-sort-value="0.74" | 740 m || 
|-id=941 bgcolor=#fefefe
| 284941 ||  || — || March 9, 2010 || Taunus || E. Schwab, R. Kling || — || align=right | 1.2 km || 
|-id=942 bgcolor=#fefefe
| 284942 ||  || — || March 10, 2010 || Moletai || K. Černis, J. Zdanavičius || V || align=right data-sort-value="0.89" | 890 m || 
|-id=943 bgcolor=#E9E9E9
| 284943 ||  || — || March 5, 2010 || Kitt Peak || Spacewatch || — || align=right | 1.2 km || 
|-id=944 bgcolor=#E9E9E9
| 284944 ||  || — || March 9, 2010 || La Sagra || OAM Obs. || ADE || align=right | 3.1 km || 
|-id=945 bgcolor=#d6d6d6
| 284945 Saint-Imier ||  ||  || March 14, 2010 || Vicques || M. Ory || — || align=right | 2.9 km || 
|-id=946 bgcolor=#fefefe
| 284946 ||  || — || March 12, 2010 || Mount Lemmon || Mount Lemmon Survey || — || align=right | 2.4 km || 
|-id=947 bgcolor=#E9E9E9
| 284947 ||  || — || March 13, 2010 || Mount Lemmon || Mount Lemmon Survey || — || align=right | 1.2 km || 
|-id=948 bgcolor=#E9E9E9
| 284948 ||  || — || March 14, 2010 || Kitt Peak || Spacewatch || — || align=right | 1.4 km || 
|-id=949 bgcolor=#fefefe
| 284949 ||  || — || March 12, 2010 || Catalina || CSS || — || align=right | 1.1 km || 
|-id=950 bgcolor=#E9E9E9
| 284950 ||  || — || October 11, 2007 || Catalina || CSS || — || align=right | 3.7 km || 
|-id=951 bgcolor=#E9E9E9
| 284951 ||  || — || March 15, 2010 || Catalina || CSS || RAF || align=right | 1.6 km || 
|-id=952 bgcolor=#d6d6d6
| 284952 ||  || — || March 15, 2010 || Mount Lemmon || Mount Lemmon Survey || — || align=right | 4.0 km || 
|-id=953 bgcolor=#E9E9E9
| 284953 ||  || — || May 2, 2006 || Catalina || CSS || ADE || align=right | 2.8 km || 
|-id=954 bgcolor=#E9E9E9
| 284954 ||  || — || March 12, 2010 || Kitt Peak || Spacewatch || — || align=right | 2.0 km || 
|-id=955 bgcolor=#E9E9E9
| 284955 ||  || — || March 12, 2010 || Mount Lemmon || Mount Lemmon Survey || — || align=right | 2.6 km || 
|-id=956 bgcolor=#E9E9E9
| 284956 ||  || — || March 13, 2010 || Kitt Peak || Spacewatch || — || align=right | 3.7 km || 
|-id=957 bgcolor=#E9E9E9
| 284957 ||  || — || March 14, 2010 || Kitt Peak || Spacewatch || — || align=right | 1.2 km || 
|-id=958 bgcolor=#E9E9E9
| 284958 ||  || — || March 15, 2010 || Mount Lemmon || Mount Lemmon Survey || — || align=right | 1.6 km || 
|-id=959 bgcolor=#d6d6d6
| 284959 ||  || — || March 13, 2010 || Catalina || CSS || HYG || align=right | 3.1 km || 
|-id=960 bgcolor=#d6d6d6
| 284960 ||  || — || March 15, 2010 || Mount Lemmon || Mount Lemmon Survey || — || align=right | 3.1 km || 
|-id=961 bgcolor=#E9E9E9
| 284961 ||  || — || March 15, 2010 || Catalina || CSS || — || align=right | 2.0 km || 
|-id=962 bgcolor=#E9E9E9
| 284962 ||  || — || March 16, 2010 || Kitt Peak || Spacewatch || — || align=right | 2.1 km || 
|-id=963 bgcolor=#d6d6d6
| 284963 ||  || — || March 16, 2010 || Mount Lemmon || Mount Lemmon Survey || — || align=right | 3.4 km || 
|-id=964 bgcolor=#E9E9E9
| 284964 ||  || — || March 17, 2010 || Mount Lemmon || Mount Lemmon Survey || — || align=right | 2.4 km || 
|-id=965 bgcolor=#E9E9E9
| 284965 ||  || — || March 17, 2010 || Catalina || CSS || — || align=right | 3.9 km || 
|-id=966 bgcolor=#E9E9E9
| 284966 ||  || — || March 18, 2010 || Mount Lemmon || Mount Lemmon Survey || HEN || align=right | 1.3 km || 
|-id=967 bgcolor=#d6d6d6
| 284967 ||  || — || March 18, 2010 || Mount Lemmon || Mount Lemmon Survey || — || align=right | 3.6 km || 
|-id=968 bgcolor=#d6d6d6
| 284968 ||  || — || March 20, 2010 || Catalina || CSS || — || align=right | 3.7 km || 
|-id=969 bgcolor=#E9E9E9
| 284969 ||  || — || March 19, 2010 || Purple Mountain || PMO NEO || — || align=right | 2.5 km || 
|-id=970 bgcolor=#E9E9E9
| 284970 ||  || — || August 6, 2002 || Palomar || NEAT || NEM || align=right | 2.7 km || 
|-id=971 bgcolor=#E9E9E9
| 284971 ||  || — || April 3, 2010 || Purple Mountain || PMO NEO || — || align=right | 3.2 km || 
|-id=972 bgcolor=#E9E9E9
| 284972 ||  || — || April 3, 2010 || Kitt Peak || Spacewatch || — || align=right | 2.5 km || 
|-id=973 bgcolor=#d6d6d6
| 284973 ||  || — || April 5, 2010 || Kitt Peak || Spacewatch || — || align=right | 3.2 km || 
|-id=974 bgcolor=#d6d6d6
| 284974 ||  || — || April 5, 2010 || Kitt Peak || Spacewatch || — || align=right | 3.6 km || 
|-id=975 bgcolor=#d6d6d6
| 284975 ||  || — || April 5, 2010 || Kitt Peak || Spacewatch || — || align=right | 3.8 km || 
|-id=976 bgcolor=#d6d6d6
| 284976 ||  || — || April 6, 2010 || Catalina || CSS || — || align=right | 4.7 km || 
|-id=977 bgcolor=#d6d6d6
| 284977 ||  || — || April 14, 2010 || Sierra Stars || Sierra Stars Obs. || BRA || align=right | 1.9 km || 
|-id=978 bgcolor=#d6d6d6
| 284978 ||  || — || April 7, 2010 || Kitt Peak || Spacewatch || — || align=right | 3.0 km || 
|-id=979 bgcolor=#d6d6d6
| 284979 ||  || — || April 7, 2010 || Kitt Peak || Spacewatch || — || align=right | 3.5 km || 
|-id=980 bgcolor=#E9E9E9
| 284980 ||  || — || April 10, 2010 || Mount Lemmon || Mount Lemmon Survey || — || align=right | 3.2 km || 
|-id=981 bgcolor=#d6d6d6
| 284981 ||  || — || April 11, 2010 || Mount Lemmon || Mount Lemmon Survey || — || align=right | 3.8 km || 
|-id=982 bgcolor=#d6d6d6
| 284982 ||  || — || April 6, 2010 || Kitt Peak || Spacewatch || — || align=right | 3.8 km || 
|-id=983 bgcolor=#d6d6d6
| 284983 ||  || — || April 10, 2010 || Kitt Peak || Spacewatch || — || align=right | 4.5 km || 
|-id=984 bgcolor=#E9E9E9
| 284984 Ikaunieks ||  ||  || April 12, 2010 || Baldone || K. Černis, I. Eglītis || — || align=right | 1.7 km || 
|-id=985 bgcolor=#d6d6d6
| 284985 ||  || — || April 14, 2010 || Mount Lemmon || Mount Lemmon Survey || — || align=right | 4.3 km || 
|-id=986 bgcolor=#d6d6d6
| 284986 ||  || — || April 25, 2010 || Mount Lemmon || Mount Lemmon Survey || — || align=right | 6.0 km || 
|-id=987 bgcolor=#d6d6d6
| 284987 ||  || — || September 20, 2001 || Socorro || LINEAR || — || align=right | 3.4 km || 
|-id=988 bgcolor=#E9E9E9
| 284988 ||  || — || May 5, 2010 || Mount Lemmon || Mount Lemmon Survey || HOF || align=right | 3.3 km || 
|-id=989 bgcolor=#d6d6d6
| 284989 ||  || — || May 5, 2010 || Nogales || Tenagra II Obs. || LIX || align=right | 4.3 km || 
|-id=990 bgcolor=#d6d6d6
| 284990 ||  || — || May 5, 2010 || Mount Lemmon || Mount Lemmon Survey || — || align=right | 4.6 km || 
|-id=991 bgcolor=#d6d6d6
| 284991 ||  || — || May 12, 2010 || Mount Lemmon || Mount Lemmon Survey || — || align=right | 4.4 km || 
|-id=992 bgcolor=#d6d6d6
| 284992 ||  || — || May 12, 2010 || Kitt Peak || Spacewatch || — || align=right | 3.4 km || 
|-id=993 bgcolor=#E9E9E9
| 284993 ||  || — || May 5, 2010 || Mount Lemmon || Mount Lemmon Survey || HOF || align=right | 2.9 km || 
|-id=994 bgcolor=#fefefe
| 284994 ||  || — || May 20, 2010 || Haleakala || M. Micheli || PHO || align=right | 1.3 km || 
|-id=995 bgcolor=#d6d6d6
| 284995 ||  || — || May 31, 2010 || WISE || WISE || — || align=right | 2.6 km || 
|-id=996 bgcolor=#d6d6d6
| 284996 Rosaparks ||  ||  || June 9, 2010 || WISE || WISE || — || align=right | 3.5 km || 
|-id=997 bgcolor=#E9E9E9
| 284997 ||  || — || July 4, 2010 || WISE || WISE || PAD || align=right | 3.2 km || 
|-id=998 bgcolor=#d6d6d6
| 284998 ||  || — || July 7, 2010 || WISE || WISE || — || align=right | 4.7 km || 
|-id=999 bgcolor=#d6d6d6
| 284999 ||  || — || July 2, 2010 || WISE || WISE || — || align=right | 4.5 km || 
|-id=000 bgcolor=#d6d6d6
| 285000 ||  || — || July 23, 2010 || WISE || WISE || — || align=right | 3.9 km || 
|}

References

External links 
 Discovery Circumstances: Numbered Minor Planets (280001)–(285000) (IAU Minor Planet Center)

0284